There are members of the United States House of Representatives who spent only a single two-year term (or less) in office usually either due to death, resignation, or defeat. In some rare cases freshmen members have decided to run for another office or not run for reelection. Many members who serve in the House for only one term are viewed by historians and political experts as having won under circumstances largely beyond their control, such as riding in on the coattails of a popular presidential or statewide candidate of their party, or by running against a scandalized incumbent.

Not included in this list are non-voting delegates. Members who served in the United States Congress, but also served in the Congress of the Confederate States or as a delegate, are included. For members-elect who never took office, see List of members-elect of the United States House of Representatives who never took their seats.

1st Congress (1789–1791)

2nd Congress (1791–1793)

3rd Congress (1793–1795)

4th Congress (1795–1797)

5th Congress (1797–1799)

6th Congress (1799–1801)

7th Congress (1801–1803)

8th Congress (1803–1805) 

 Andrew McCord DR-NY
 Nahum Mitchell Federalist-MA
 Beriah Palmer DR-NY
 John Paterson DR-NY
 Oliver Phelps DR-NY
 Samuel D. Purviance Federalist-NC
 George Tibbits Federalist-NY

9th Congress (1805–1807) 

 Caleb Ellis F-NH
 Silas Halsey DR-NY
 John Hamilton DR-PA
 Duncan McFarlan DR-NC
 Peter Sailly DR-NY
 O'Brien Smith DR-SC
 Thomas W. Thompson F-NH
 Eliphalet Wickes DR-NY

10th Congress (1807–1809) 

 Peter Carleton DR-NH
 Josiah Dean DR-MA
 Daniel Meserve Durell DR-NH
 Francis Gardner DR-NH
 John Harris DR-NY
 John Hiester DR-PA
 Reuben Humphrey DR-NY
 William Kirkpatrick DR-NY
 John Rowan DR-KY
 Jedediah K. Smith DR-NH
 Clement Storer DR-NH
 James I. Van Alen DR-NY
 Jesse Wharton DR-TN
 Isaac Wilbour DR-RI
 James Witherell DR-VT

11th Congress (1809–1811) 

 William T. Barry DR-KY
 Daniel Blaisdell F-NH
 John Brown DR-MD
 John Curtis Chamberlain F-NH
 James Cox DR-NJ
 Henry Crist DR-KY
 William Denning DR-NY
 Gideon Gardner DR-MA
 David S. Garland DR-VA
 Daniel Hiester DR-PA
 Jonathan Hatch Hubbard F-VT
 William McKinley DR-VA
 Pleasant Moorman Miller DR-TN
 John Nicholson DR-NY
 Benjamin Pickman Jr. Federalist-MA
 John A. Scudder DR-NJ
 Robert Weakley DR-TN
 James Wilson I F-NH
 Robert Witherspoon DR-SC

12th Congress (1811–1813) 

 John Baker F-VA
 Josiah Bartlett Jr. DR-NH
 Francis Carr DR-MA
 Samuel Dinsmoor DR-NH
 Asa Fitch F-NY
 Obed Hall DR-NH
 John Adams Harper DR-NH
 Joseph Lefever DR-PA
 George C. Maxwell DR-NJ
 Arunah Metcalf DR-NY
 James Milnor F-PA
 William Paulding Jr. DR-NY
 Benjamin Pond DR-NY
 William Rodman DR-PA
 Silas Stow DR-NY
 Peleg Tallman DR-MA
 Pierre Van Cortlandt Jr. DR-NY
 Leonard White Federalist-MA
 Thomas Wilson F-VA

13th Congress (1813–1815) 

 Reasin Beall DR-OH
 Thomas Bines DR-NJ
 Ezra Butler DR-VT
 Hugh Caperton F-VA
 William Coxe Jr. F-NJ
 Edward Crouch DR-PA
 Samuel Davis F-MA
 Peter Denoyelles DR-NY
 William Pope Duval DR-KY
 David R. Evans DR-SC
 Samuel Farrow DR-SC
 Peter Forney DR-NC
 James Geddes F-NY
 John Gloninger F-PA
 Theodore Gourdin DR-SC
 Abraham J. Hasbrouck DR-NY
 Samuel Henderson F-PA
 Samuel Hopkins DR-KY
 Samuel M. Hopkins F-NY
 Nathaniel W. Howell F-NY
 Levi Hubbard DR-MA
 Parry Wayne Humphreys DR-TN
 John Kershaw DR-SC
 John Lefferts DR-NY
 Jacob Markell F-NY
 Jotham Post Jr. F-NY
 Samuel Sherwood F-NY
 Zebulon R. Shipherd F-NY
 Richard Skinner DR-VT
 Isaac Smith DR-PA
 Samuel Smith F-NH
 William Stephens Smith F-NY
 Richard Stockton F-NJ
 Adamson Tannehill DR-PA
 Francis White F-VA
 James Whitehill DR-PA
 Elisha I. Winter F-NY
 Abiel Wood DR-MA

14th Congress (1815–1817) 

 Asa Adgate DR-NY
 Charles Humphrey Atherton F-NH
 Ezra Baker DR-NJ
 Samuel Betts DR-NY
 James Birdsall DR-NY
 Daniel Cady F-NY
 Daniel Chipman F-VT
 Archibald S. Clarke DR-NY
 Henry Crocheron DR-NY
 Samuel Dickens DR-NC
 Thomas Fletcher DR-KY
 John Hahn DR-PA
 Jabez Delano Hammond DR-NY
 Luther Jewett F-VT
 Chauncey Langdon F-VT
 William Carter Love DR-NC
 Asa Lyon F-VT
 Charles Marsh F-VT
 William Mayrant DR-SC
 John Noyes F-VT
 George Poindexter DR-MS
 William H. Roane DR-VA
 Asahel Stearns Federalist-MA
 Abraham H. Schenck DR-NY
 Thomas Smith F-PA
 Micah Taul DR-KY
 John Taylor DR-SC
 Isaac Thomas DR-TN
 Jonathan Ward DR-NY
 Westel Willoughby Jr. DR-NY
 John Woods F-PA
 William Woodward DR-SC

15th Congress (1817–1819) 
 Heman Allen DR-VT
 Archibald Austin DR-VA
 Joseph Bellinger DR-SC
 Thomas Claiborne DR-TN
 James West Clark DR-NC
 Edward Colston Federalist-VA
 Daniel Cruger DR-NY
 Isaac Darlington Federalist-PA
 John R. Drake Republican-NY
 Benjamin Ellicott Dr-NY
 Joshua Gage DR-MA
 Sylvester Gilbert DR-CT
 Salma Hale DR-NH
 Peter Hitchcock DR-OH
 Samuel E. Hogg DR-TN
 Uriel Holmes Federalist-CT
 William Hunter DR-VT
 Dorrance Kirtland DR-NY
 Thomas Lawyer Republican-NY
 William J. Lewis DR-VA
 George Washington Lent Marr DR-TN
 John McLean DR-IL
 George Mumford DR-NC
 Wilson Nesbitt DR-SC
 David A. Ogden Federalist-NY
 Alexander Ogle DR-PA
 Benjamin Orr F-MA
 James Owen Republican-NC
 John Fabyan Parrott DR-NH
 Levi Pawling Federalist-PA
 John Pegram DR-VA
 George Poindexter DR-MS
 James Porter DR-NY
 Philip Jeremiah Schuyler Federalist-NY
 Tredwell Scudder DR-NY
 David Scott DR-PA
 Samuel B. Sherwood Federalist-CT
 Jacob Spangler Republican-PA
 Thomas Speed DR-KY
 John Canfield Spencer DR-NY
 James Stewart Federalist-NC
 James Tallmadge Jr. DR-NY
 Nathaniel Terry Federalist-CT
 Rensselaer Westerlo Federalist-NY
 Thomas Scott Williams Federalist-CT

16th Congress (1819–1821) 
 Nathaniel Allen DR-NY
 Caleb Baker DR-NY
 Joseph Brevard Republican-SC
 William Brown DR-KY
 Henry Brush DR-OH
 Henry Hunter Bryan DR-TN
 Joseph Buffum Jr. DR-NH
 Wingfield Bullock DR-KY
 Walter Case DR-NY
 Robert Clark DR-NY
 John Condit DR-NJ
 John Crowell DR-AL
 John Alfred Cuthbert DR-GA
 Jacob H. De Witt DR-NY
 Edward Dowse Republican-MA
 John Fay Republican-NY
 William Donnison Ford Republican-NY
 John C. Gray DR-VA
 Ezra C. Gross DR-NY
 James Guyon Jr. DR-NY
 Aaron Hackley Jr. Republican-NY
 George Hall Republican-NY
 Nathaniel Hazard DR-RI
 Jacob Hibshman DR-PA
 Jonas Kendall Federalist-MA
 Martin Kinsley DR-MA
 Joseph S. Lyman DR-NY
 John McCreary DR-SC
 Thomas Grubb McCullough Federalist-PA
 Henry Meigs DR-NY
 Severn E. Parker DR-VA
 Harmanus Peek DR-NY
 Robert Philson DR-PA
 Charles Pinckney DR-SC
 Jonathan Richmond DR-NY
 Bernard Smith DR-NJ
 James Stevens Republican-CT
 Randall S. Street F-NY

17th Congress (1821–1823) 
 Gideon Barstow DR-MA
 Lewis Bigelow Federalist-MA
 Charles Borland Jr. DR-NY
 James D. Breckinridge Republican-KY
 Daniel Azro Ashley Buck DR-VT
 Daniel Burrows Republican-CT
 Samuel Campbell DR-NY
 David Chambers Republican-OH
 Cadwallader D. Colden F-NY
 Alfred Conkling DR-NY
 Jeremiah Cosden Republican-MD
 Josiah Crudup DR-NC
 James Duncan Republican-PA
 John Gebhard F-NY
 Mark Harris DR-ME
 James Hawkes Republican-NY
 Josiah S. Johnston DR-LA
 Elias Keyes DR-VT
 Joseph Kirkland F-NY
 Richard McCarty DR-NY
 James McSherry Federalist-PA
 Thomas Murray Jr. DR-PA
 John Nelson W-MD
 Henry Olin DR-VT
 John Phillips Federalist-PA
 Jeremiah H. Pierson DR-NY
 Daniel Rodney F-DE
 Charles H. Ruggles F-NY
 Jonathan Russell DR-MA
 John Speed Smith DR-KY
 Elijah Spencer DR-NY
 Micah Sterling F-NY
 Reuben H. Walworth DR-NY
 Phineas White DR-VT
 William D. Williamson DR-ME
 Samuel H. Woodson DR-KY
 Ludwig Worman F-PA

18th Congress (1823–1825) 
 Samuel Breck Adams-Clay Federalist-PA
 John W. Cady Adams-Clay Republican-NY
 Jacob Call Jackson Republican-IN
 Lot Clark Crawford Republican-NY
 Ela Collins Crawford Republican-NY
 Justin Dwinell Crawford Republican-NY
 Lewis Eaton Adams-Clay Republican-NY
 Charles A. Foote Crawford Republican-NY
 Joel Frost Crawford Republican-NY
 Alfred Moore Gatlin Crawford Republican-NC
 James W. Gazlay Jackson Republican-OH
 William Hayward Jr. Crawford Republican-MD
 John Herkimer Adams-Clay Republican-NY
 James L. Hogeboom Crawford Republican-NY
 Lemuel Jenkins Crawford Republican-NY
 Samuel Lawrence Adams-Clay Republican-NY
 John Lee Jackson Federalist-MD
 Stephen Longfellow Federalist-ME
 Duncan McArthur Adams-Clay Republican-OH
 George Outlaw Crawford Republican-NC
 John Patterson Adams-Clay Republican-OH
 Walter Patterson F-NY
 William Prince Jackson Republican-IN
 John Richards Crawford Republican-NY
 James T. Sandford Jackson Republican-TN
 Peter Sharpe Adams-Clay Republican-NY
 Jonas Sibley Adams-Clay Republican-MA
 Richard Dobbs Spaight Jr. Crawford Republican-NC
 Philip Thompson Adams-Clay Republican-KY
 Jacob Tyson Crawford Republican-NY
 Robert Brank Vance Jackson Republican-NC
 Isaac Wayne Jackson Federalist-PA
 David White Adams-Clay Republican-KY
 Lemuel Whitman Adams-Clay Republican-CT
 Isaac Wilson DR-NY
 William Woods Adams-Clay Republican-NY

19th Congress (1825–1827) 
 Henry Ashley Jacksonian-NY
 Luther Badger Anti-Jacksonian-NY
 George William Crump Jacksonian-VA
 William Dietz Jacksonian-NY
 Nehemiah Eastman Anti-Jacksonian-NH
 Benjamin Estil Anti-Jacksonian-VA
 Nicoll Fosdick Anti-Jacksonian-NY
 Abraham Bruyn Hasbrouck Anti-Jacksonian-NY
 John Flournoy Henry Adams candidate-KY
 Richard Hines Jacksonian-NC
 Daniel Hugunin Jr. Anti-Jacksonian-NY
 Charles Humphrey Anti-Jacksonian-NY
 David Jennings Anti-Jacksonian-OH
 James Johnson Jacksonian-KY
 Charles Kellogg Jacksonian-NY
 Thomas Kittera Anti-Jacksonian-PA
 Jacob Krebs Jacksonian-PA
 Robert N. Martin Adams candidate-MD
 William McManus Anti-Jacksonian-NY
 James Meriwether Jacksonian-GA
 John Miller Anti-Jacksonian-NY
 Thomas J. Oakley Jacksonian-NY
 Timothy H. Porter Adams candidate-NY
 Alfred H. Powell Adams candidate-VA
 Henry H. Ross Anti-Jacksonian-NY
 Thomas Shannon Anti-Jacksonian-OH
 Robert Taylor Anti-Jacksonian-VA
 Elias Whitmore Anti-Jacksonian-NY
 Bartow White National Republican-NY
 Thomas C. Worthington Adams candidate-MD
 John Wurts Jacksonian-PA

20th Congress (1827–1829) 
 Samuel Anderson Adams candidate-PA
 David Barker Jr. Adams candidate-NH
 Stephen Barlow Jacksonian-PA
 Edward Bates Adams candidate-MO
 George O. Belden Jacksonian-NY
 Thomas H. Blake Adams candidate-IN
 Elias Brown Jacksonian-MD
 Rudolph Bunner Jacksonian-NY
 Samuel Chase Anti-Jacksonian-NY
 John Davenport Anti-Jacksonian-OH
 David Ellicott Evans Jacksonian-NY
 John Floyd Jacksonian-GA
 Tomlinson Fort Jacksonian-GA
 Levin Gale Jacksonian-MD
 Nathaniel Garrow Jacksonian-NY
 Selah R. Hobbie Jacksonian-NY
 Richard Keese Jacksonian-NY
 Isaac Leffler Anti-Jacksonian-VA
 John Maynard Anti-Jacksonian-NY
 Francis Swaine Muhlenberg Anti-Jacksonian-OH
 David Plant Anti-Jacksonian-CT
 Oliver H. Smith Jacksonian-IN
 Thomas Sinnickson Anti-Jacksonian-NJ
 John G. Stower Jacksonian-NY
 Thomas Taber II Jacksonian-NY
 Hedge Thompson Anti-Jacksonian-NJ
 Daniel Turner Jacksonian-NC
 John J. Wood Jacksonian-NY
 Silas Wright Jacksonian-NY

21st Congress (1829–1831) 
 Benedict Arnold Anti-Jacksonian-NY
 Robert Emmett Bledsoe Baylor Jacksonian-AL
 Thomas Beekman Anti-Jacksonian-NY
 Peter I. Borst Jacksonian-NY
 Elias Brown Jacksonian-MD
 Nicholas D. Coleman Jacksonian-KY
 Henry B. Cowles Anti-Jacksonian-NY
 Jacob Crocheron Jacksonian-NY
 Charles G. DeWitt Jacksonian-NY
 Edward Bishop Dudley Jacksonian-NC
 Samuel W. Eager Anti-Jacksonian-NY
 Isaac Finch Anti-Jacksonian-NY
 George Fisher Anti-Jacksonian-NY
 John M. Goodenow Jacksonian-OH
 Jehiel H. Halsey Jacksonian-NY
 Joseph Hawkins Anti-Jacksonian-NY
 Thomas Irwin Jacksonian-PA
 John Kincaid Jacksonian-KY
 Perkins King Jacksonian-NY
 George Gray Leiper Jacksonian-PA
 Alem Marr Jacksonian-PA 
 Thomas Maxwell Jacksonian-NY 
 William McCreery Jacksonian-PA
 Ebenezer F. Norton Jacksonian-NY 
 Walter Hampden Overton Jacksonian-LA
 Gershom Powers Jacksonian-NY
 Jonah Sanford Jacksonian-NY
 James Shields Jacksonian-OH
 John Scott Jacksonian-PA
 Ambrose Spencer Anti-Jacksonian-NY
 Richard Spencer Jacksonian-MD

22nd Congress (1831–1833) 
 John Adair Jacksonian-KY
 Robert Allison Anti-Masonic-PA
 William Babcock Anti-Masonic-NY
 Gamaliel H. Barstow Anti-Masonic-NY
 James Bates Jacksonian-ME
 John T. Bergen Jacksonian-NY
 Lauchlin Bethune Jacksonian-NC
 John Branch Jacksonian-NC
 Joseph Bouck Jacksonian-NY
 John Conrad Bucher Jacksonian-PA
 John A. Collier Anti-Masonic-NY
 Silas Condit Anti-Jacksonian-NJ
 Bates Cooke Anti-Masonic-NY
 Eleutheros Cooke Anti-Jackson-OH
 Charles Dayan Jacksonian-NY 
 Henry Alexander Scammell Dearborn Anti-Jacksonian-MA
 Lewis Dewart Jacksonian-PA
 William Fitzgerald Jacksonian-TN
 William Hall Jacksonian-TN
 William Hogan Jacksonian-NY
 Henry Horn Jacksonian-PA
 Freeborn G. Jewett Jacksonian-NY
 Charles Clement Johnston Jacksonian-VA
 John King Jacksonian-NY
 Robert McCoy Jacksonian-PA
 Daniel Newnan Jacksonian-GA
 Edmund H. Pendleton Jacksonian-NY
 Edward C. Reed Jacksonian-NY
 John J. Roane Jacksonian-VA
 Nathan Soule Jacksonian-NY
 Isaac Southard Anti-Jacksonian-NJ
 Grattan H. Wheeler Anti-Masonic-NY
 Samuel J. Wilkin Anti-Jacksonian-NY

23rd Congress (1833–1835) 
 John Adams Jacksonian-NY
 John J. Allen Anti-Jacksonian-VA
 William Allen Jacksonian-OH
 Charles Augustus Barnitz Anti-Masonic-PA
 Martin Beaty Anti-Jacksonian-KY
 James Martin Bell Anti-Jacksonian-OH
 Horace Binney Anti-Jacksonian-PA
 Charles Bodle Jacksonian-NY
 John Bull Anti-Jacksonian-MO
 Harry Cage Jacksonian-MS
 Richard Bennett Carmichael Jacksonian-MD
 Amos Davis Anti-Jacksonian-KY
 Benjamin F. Deming Anti-Masonic-VT
 Littleton Purnell Dennis Anti-Jacksonian-MD
 John H. Fulton Jacksonian-VA
 James Gholson Anti-Jacksonian-VA
 Nicoll Halsey Jacksonian-NY
 Samuel G. Hathaway Jacksonian-NY
 James P. Heath Jacksonian-MD
 Edward Howell Jacksonian-NY
 William Marshall Inge Jacksonian-TN
 Cornelius Lawrence Jacksonian-NY
 James Love Anti-Jacksonian-KY
 Robert Todd Lytle Jacksonian-OH (resigned and then won special election to finish own term)
 John McKinley Jacksonian-AL
 Charles McVean Jacksonian-NY
 Phineas Miner Anti-Jacksonian-CT
 Henry Mitchell Jacksonian-NY
 Robert Mitchell Jacksonian-OH
 John Murphy Jacksonian-AL
 Patrick H. Pope Jacksonian-KY
 Ebenezer Jackson Jr. Anti-Jacksonian-CT
 Noadiah Johnson Jacksonian-NY
 Cornelius Lawrence Jacksonian-NY
 Samuel M. Moore Anti-Jacksonian-VA
 Gayton P. Osgood Jacksonian-MA
 Dudley Selden Jacksonian-NY
 Thomas D. Singleton Nullifier-SC
 Charles Slade Jacksonian-IL
 John Truman Stoddert Jacksonian-MD
 William P. Taylor Anti-Jacksonian-VA
 Samuel Tweedy Anti-Jacksonian-CT
 Isaac B. Van Houten Jacksonian-NY
 Reuben Whallon Jacksonian-NY
 Edgar C. Wilson Anti-Jacksonian-VA

24th Congress (1835–1837) 
 Michael Woolston Ash Jacksonian-PA
 Jeremiah Bailey Anti-Jacksonian-ME
 Samuel Barton Jacksonian-NY
 Matthias J. Bovee Jacksonian-NY
 Graham H. Chapin Jacksonian-NY
 William Chetwood Jacksonian-NJ
 David Dickson Anti-Jacksonian-MS
 Valentine Efner Jacksonian-NY
 Dudley Farlin Jacksonian-NY
 William Graham W-IN
 Samuel Hoar Anti-Jacksonian-MA
 Elias Howell Anti-Jacksonian-OH
 Adam Huntsman Jacksonian-TN
 Andrew T. Judson Jacksonian-CT
 Gideon Lee Jacksonian-NY
 Joshua Lee Jacksonian-NY
 Thomas C. Love Anti-Jacksonian-NY
 William Mason Jacksonian-NY
 Rutger B. Miller Jacksonian-NY
 John James Pearson Anti-Jacksonian-PA
 Ebenezer Pettigrew Anti-Jacksonian-NC
 Joseph Reynolds Jacksonian-NY
 John W. A. Sanford Jacksonian-GA
 William Seymour Jacksonian-NY
 Nicholas Sickles Jacksonian-NY
 William Sprague III W-NY
 Bellamy Storer Anti-Jacksonian-OH
 James C. Terrell Jacksonian-GA
 Zalmon Wildman Jacksonian-CT

25th Congress (1837–1839) 
 James Alexander Jr. W-OH
 John T. Andrews D-NY
 Cyrus Beers D-NY
 Bennet Bicknell D-NY
 Samuel Birdsall D-NY
 Isaac H. Bronson D-NY
 Andrew DeWitt Bruyn D-NY
 Timothy J. Carter D-ME
 Richard Cheatham W-TN
 Jonathan Cilley D-ME
 Charles D. Coffin W-OH
 George Hedford Dunn W-IN
 John Edwards D-NY
 James Farrington D-NH
 Richard Fletcher W-MA
 Henry A. Foster D-NY
 Albert Gallup D-NY
 Abraham P. Grant D-NY
 Hiram Gray D-NY
 Francis Jacob Harper D-PA
 William H. Hunter D-OH
 Hugh S. Legaré D-SC
 Andrew W. Loomis W-OH
 Arphaxed Loomis D-NY
 James Murray Mason D-VA
 Richard Menefee W-KY
 John L. Murray D-KY
 William H. Noble D-NY
 Joseph C. Noyes W-ME
 William Patterson W-NY
 Amasa J. Parker D-NY
 Isaac S. Pennybacker D-VA
 Seargent Smith Prentiss W-MS
 Harvey Putnam W-NY
 Luther Reily D-PA
 Edward Robinson W-ME
 Edward Rumsey W-KY
 Samuel Tredwell Sawyer W-NC
 Daniel Sheffer D-PA
 Matthias Shepler D-OH
 Mark H. Sibley W-NY
 James B. Spencer D-NY
 Adam W. Snyder D-IL
 William Wright Southgate W-KY
 William Stone W-TN
 Archibald Stuart D-VA
 Obadiah Titus D-NY
 Henry Vail D-NY
 Abraham Vanderveer D-NY
 Thomas J. Word W-MS

26th Congress (1839–1841) 
 Judson Allen D-NY
 James C. Alvord W-MA
 Simeon H. Anderson W-KY
 Henry Marie Brackenridge W-PA
 Anson Brown W-NY
 James Carroll D-MD
 Thomas Withers Chinn W-LA
 William Raworth Cooper D-NJ
 John Davis D-PA
 James De La Montanya D-NY
 Nicholas B. Doe W-NY
 Nehemiah H. Earll D-NY
 John Ely D-NY
 John Fine D-NY
 Moses H. Grinnell W-NY
 Augustus C. Hand D-NY
 John Hill D-NC
 John Hill W-VA
 Solomon Hillen Jr. D-MD
 Joel Holleman D-VA
 Hines Holt W-GA
 Tilghman Howard D-IN
 Charles Johnston W-NY
 Thomas Kempshall W-NY
 Joseph Kille D-NJ
 Isaac Leet D-PA
 Meredith Mallory D-NY
 William M. McCarty W-VA
 George McCulloch D-PA
 James Monroe W-NY
 Rufus Palen W-NY
 William Sterrett Ramsey D-PA
 Thomas Robinson Jr. D-DE
 Edward Rogers D-NY
 Daniel Bailey Ryall D-NJ
 Green Berry Samuels D-VA
 Albert Smith D-ME
 John Smith D-VT
 Theron R. Strong D-NY
 Jonathan Taylor D-OH
 Peter Dumont Vroom D-NJ
 Peter Joseph Wagner W-NY

27th Congress (1841–1843) 
 Elisha Hunt Allen W-ME
 Sherlock James Andrews W-OH
 Alfred Babcock W-NY
 Richard W. Barton W-VA
 Henry White Beeson D-PA
 Henry Black W-PA
 Bernard Blair W-NY
 Samuel S. Bowne D-NY
 David Bronson W-ME
 William Butler W-SC
 Patrick C. Caldwell D-SC
 Greene Washington Caldwell D-NC
 Thomas Jefferson Campbell W-TN
 Robert L. Caruthers W-TN
 George B. Cary D-VA
 Benjamin S. Cowen W-OH
 James H. Cravens W-IN
 George W. Crawford W-GA
 John Bennett Dawson D-LA
 Davis Dimock Jr. D-PA
 John Cummins Edwards D-MO
 Joseph Egbert D-NY
 William P. Fessenden W-ME
 Charles A. Floyd D-NY
 A. Lawrence Foster W-NY
 John Greig W-NY
 Amos Gustine D-PA
 William M. Gwin D-MS
 William Alexander Harris D-VA
 Samuel Lewis Hays D-VA
 Jacob Houck Jr. D-NY
 Jacob M. Howard W-MI
 William W. Irwin W-PA
 William Jack D-PA
 Isaac Dashiell Jones W-MD
 Archibald L. Linn W-NY
 Alfred Marshall D-ME
 Thomas Francis Marshall W-KY
 John Thomson Mason Jr. D-MD
 Joshua Mathiot W-OH
 James Archibald Meriwether W-GA
 Anderson Mitchell W-NC
 William M. Oliver D-NY
 Bryan Owsley W-KY
 Samuel Partridge D-NY
 Nathanael G. Pendleton W-OH
 Cuthbert Powell W-VA
 Alexander Randall W-MD
 Lewis Riggs D-NY
 James I. Roosevelt D-NY
 James McPherson Russell W-PA
 John Sanford D-NY
 Benjamin Glover Shields D-AL
 John Snyder D-PA
 James Sprigg W-KY
 Samuel Stokely W-OH
 Alexander Hugh Holmes Stuart W-VA
 Thomas A. Tomlinson W-NY
 Samuel W. Trotti D-SC
 John Van Buren D-NY
 Henry Bell Van Rensselaer W-NY
 David Wallace W-IN
 William Henry Washington W-NC
 John Westbrook D-PA
 Joseph L. White W-IN
 James Wray Williams D-MD
 Augustus Young W-VT

28th Congress (1843–1845) 
 John Baptista Ashe W-TN
 James Edwin Belser D-AL
 Pierre Bossier D-LA
 Gustavus Miller Bower D-MO
 Francis Brengle W-MD
 Henry R. Brinkerhoff D-OH
 Levi D. Carpenter D-NY
 Jeremiah E. Cary D-NY
 Shepard Cary D-ME
 George S. Catlin D-CT
 John Causin W-MD
 Absalom H. Chappell W-GA
 Samuel Chilton W-VA
 Duncan Lamont Clinch W-GA
 Chesselden Ellis D-NY
 Lucius Elmer D-NJ
 Isaac G. Farlee D-NJ
 Hamilton Fish W-NY
 Elias Florence W-OH
 Henry Frick W-PA
 George Fuller D-PA
 Byram Green D-NY
 John P. Hale D-NH
 Edward S. Hamlin W-OH
 William H. Hammett D-MS
 John J. Hardin W-IL
 Samuel Hays D-PA
 Joshua Herrick D-ME
 William Spring Hubbell D-NY
 James Madison Hughes D-MO
 Michael Hutchinson Jenks W-PA
 Perley B. Johnson W-OH
 Littleton Kirkpatrick D-NJ
 Alcée Louis la Branche D-LA
 John Basil Lamar D-GA
 Moses G. Leonard D-NY
 Lucius Lyon D-MI
 William C. McCauslen D-OH
 John Millen D-GA
 Heman A. Moore D-OH
 Willoughby Newton W-VA
 Thomas J. Paterson W-NY
 Elisha R. Potter Law and Order-RI
 Jacob Alexander Preston W-MD
 Meade Purdy D-NY
 Charles Manning Reed W-PA
 Orville Robinson D-NY
 Charles Rogers W-NY
 Jeremiah Russell D-NY
 Samuel C. Sample W-IN
 William Tandy Senter W-TN
 Thomas H. Seymour D-CT
 Samuel Simons D-CT
 John Slidell D-LA
 John T. Smith D-PA
 Thomas Ara Spence W-MD
 Lemuel Stetson D-NY
 John Stewart D-CT
 William Henry Stiles D-GA
 Alfred P. Stone D-OH
 Selah B. Strong D-NY
 Tilghman Tucker D-MS
 John I. Vanmeter W-OH
 John Wethered W-MD
 Benjamin White D-ME
 Joseph A. Wright D-IN

29th Congress (1845–1847) 
 Stephen Adams D-MS
 Lemuel H. Arnold W-RI
 Joshua Fry Bell W-KY
 Asa Biggs D-NC
 William Henry Brockenbrough D-FL
 John Hull Campbell Know Nothing-PA
 William W. Campbell Know Nothing-NY
 John Smith Chipman D-MI
 Henry Selby Clark D-NC
 John F. Collin D-NY
 Albert Constable D-MD
 James La Fayette Cottrell D-AL
 Erastus D. Culver W-NY
 Francis A. Cunningham D-OH
 Edmund Strother Dargan D-AL
 Jefferson Davis D-MS
 John De Mott D-NY
 James C. Dobbin D-NC
 Henry T. Ellett D-MS
 Samuel S. Ellsworth D-NY
 Jacob Erdman D-PA
 Edwin Hickman Ewing W-TN
 John Hoge Ewing W-PA
 William Swan Garvin D-PA
 William Fell Giles D-MD
 Martin Grover D-NY
 Serranus Clinton Hastings D-IA
 John Henry W-IL
 Richard P. Herrick W-NY
 William J. Hough D-PB
 John W. Lawrence D-NY
 Owen D. Leib D-PA
 Edward Henry Carroll Long W-MD
 Barclay Martin D-TN
 John Preston Martin D-KY
 Moses McClean D-PA
 John D. McCrate D-ME
 William McDaniel D-MO
 John H. McHenry W-KY
 William S. Miller Know Nothing-NY
 Mace Moulton D-NH
 Thomas Willoughby Newton W-AR
 Archibald C. Niven D-NY
 Augustus L. Perrill D-OH
 Thomas Johns Perry D-MD
 Sterling Price D-MO
 Thomas C. Ripley W-NY
 John Runk W-NJ
 John Fairfield Scamman D-ME
 Henry J. Seaman Know Nothing-NY
 Leonard Henly Sims D-MO
 Stephen Strong D-NY
 Allen G. Thurman D-OH
 William Tredway D-VA
 Andrew Trumbo W-KY
 Bradford R. Wood D-NY
 Thomas M. Woodruff Know Nothing-NY
 William W. Woodworth D-NY
 Samuel G. Wright W-NJ
 Bryan Rust Young W-KY

30th Congress (1847–1849) 
 Washington Barrow W-TN
 Hiram Belcher W-ME
 Ausburn Birdsall D-NY
 Esbon Blackmar W-NY
 Edward Bradley D-MI
 Jasper Ewing Brady W-PA
 Aylette Buckner W-KY
 Richard S. Canby W-OH
 Asa Clapp D-ME
 Franklin Clark D-ME
 Beverly L. Clarke D-KY
 William Collins D-NY
 Mason C. Darling D-WI
 Richard Spaight Donnell W-NC
 Daniel Duncan W-OH
 Garnett Duncan W-KY
 George Nicholas Eckert W-PA
 Thomas O. Edwards W-OH
 Elisha Embree W-IN
 John Wilson Farrelly W-PA
 David Fisher W-OH
 Thomas Flournoy W-VA
 Andrew S. Fulton W-VA
 John P. Gaines W-KY
 John Gayle W-AL
 Horace Greeley W-NY
 Dudley S. Gregory W-NJ
 Nathan K. Hall W-NY
 David Hammons D-ME
 William T. Haskell W-TN
 Hugh Lawson White Hill D-TN
 John M. Holley W-NY
 John Westbrook Hornbeck W-PA
 Alexander Irvin W-PA
 Alfred Iverson Sr. D-GA
 David S. Jackson D-NY
 John William Jones W-GA
 William Kennon Jr. D-OH
 Samuel Lahm D-OH
 Sidney Lawrence D-NY
 William T. Lawrence W-NY
 Abraham Lincoln W-IL
 Frederick William Lord D-NY
 Joseph Mullin W-NY
 Henry Nicoll D-NY
 John G. Palfrey W-MA
 John Perkins Jr. D-LA
 George Petrie D-NY
 William Ballard Preston W-VA
 William R. Rockhill D-IN
 James Dixon Roman W-MD
 Eliakim Sherrill W-NY
 John I. Slingerland W-NY
 Daniel B. St. John W-NY
 George Anson Starkweather D-NY
 Frederick A. Tallmadge W-NY
 Robert A. Thompson D-VA
 Patrick W. Tompkins W-MS
 Thomas J. Turner D-IL
 Cornelius Warren W-NY
 James S. Wiley D-ME

31st Congress (1849–1851) 
 Nathaniel Albertson D-IN
 Henry P. Alexander W-NY
 William J. Alston W-AL
 Josiah M. Anderson W-TN
 George Rex Andrews W-NY
 William Van Ness Bay D-MO
 John Bell W-OH
 David A. Bokee W-NY
 Walter Booth Free Soil-CT
 Daniel Breck W-KY
 John Brisbin D-PA
 Alexander W. Buel D-MI
 Thomas B. Butler W-CT
 Samuel Calvin W-PA
 Thompson Campbell D-IL
 Joseph Casey W-PA
 Charles E. Clarke W-NY
 Orsamus Cole W-WI
 Charles Magill Conrad W-LA
 Joel Buchanan Danner D-PA
 Jesse Column Dickey W-PA
 Samuel Atkins Eliot W-MA
 Andrew Ewing D-TN
 Elbridge Gerry D-ME
 Rufus K. Goodenow W-ME
 Edward Gilbert D-CA
 Herman D. Gould W-NY
 Thomas C. Hackett D-GA
 Ransom Halloway W-NY
 Andrew K. Hay W-NJ
 Thomas Haymond W-VA
 Moses Hoagland D-OH
 William Terry Jackson W-NY
 James Leeper Johnson W-KYD-VA
 John Bozman Kerr W-MD
 John A. King W-NY
 James G. King W-NJ
 Joseph E. McDonald D-IN
 Finis McLean W-KY
 Thomas McKissock W-NY
 William McWillie D-MS
 Daniel F. Miller W-IA
 Jeremiah Morton W-VA
 Alexander Newman D-VA
 Andrew Jackson Ogle W-PA
 John Otis W-ME
 Allen Ferdinand Owen W-GA
 Richard Parker D-VA
 Charles Wesley Pitman W-PA
 Robert Rentoul Reed W-PA
 William Sprague W-MI
 Charles Stetson D-ME
 John R. Thurman W-NY
 Walter Underhill W-NY
 Hiram Walden D-NY
 Loren P. Waldo D-CT
 Marshall Johnson Wellborn D-GA
 William A. Whittlesey D-OH
 Amos E. Wood D-OH
 George Washington Wright I-CA
 Timothy R. Young D-IL

32nd Congress (1851–1853) 
 Charles Andrews D-ME
 John Appleton D-ME
 Leander Babcock D-NY
 Thomas Bartlett Jr. D-VT
 Nelson Barrere W-OH
 Hiram Bell W-OH
 Thomas Marshal Bibighaus W-PA
 Obadiah Bowne W-NY
 John H. Boyd W-NY
 John Bragg D-AL
 George H. Busby D-OH
 George Houston Brown W-NJ
 Alexander H. Buell D-NY
 Charles Chapman W-CT
 Lincoln Clark D-IA
 James L. Conger W-MI
 Joseph Stewart Cottman W-MD
 John F. Darby W-MO
 George T. Davis W-MA
 Francis B. Fay W-MA
 John G. Floyd D-NY
 John D. Freeman Unionist-MS
 James M. Gaylord D-OH
 Robert Goodenow W-ME
 Emanuel B. Hart D-NY
 Augustus P. Hascall W-NY
 John Henry Hobart Haws W-NY
 Jerediah Horsford W-NY
 Thomas Y. Howe Jr. D-NY
 Willard Ives D-NY
 James Johnson Unionist-GA
 John Johnson ID-OH
 Joseph Henry Kuhns W-PA
 Joseph Aristide Landry W-LA
 Edward P. Little D-MA
 Edward C. Marshall D-CA
 Joseph W. McCorkle D-CA
 Ahiman Louis Miner W-VT
 Richard S. Molony D-IL
 James Turner Morehead D-NC
 John Alexander Morrison D-PA
 Charles Murphey Unionist-GA
 Benjamin D. Nabers Unionist-MS
 Eben Newton W-OH
 Andrew Parker D-PA
 Ebenezer J. Penniman W-MI
 Jared Perkins W-NH
 Rodman M. Price D-NJ
 William Hawkins Polk ID-TN
 Robert Rantoul Jr. D-MA
 Isaac Reed W-ME
 Reuben Robie D-NY
 Lorenzo Sabine W-MA
 Marius Schoonmaker W-NY
 Richardson A. Scurry D-TX
 William W. Snow D-NY
 Abraham P. Stephens D-NY
 James F. Strother W-VA
 Josiah Sutherland D-NY
 George W. Thompson D-VA
 Norton Strange Townshend D-OH
 Henry S. Walbridge W-NY
 Thomas Yates Walsh W-MD
 William Thomas Ward W-KY
 John Welch W-OH
 John Wells W-NY
 Addison White W-KY
 John Allen Wilcox Unionist-MS

33rd Congress (1853–1855) 
 William T. S. Barry D-MS
 Nathan Belcher D-CT
 Thomas Hart Benton D-MO
 Azariah Boody W-NY
 Robert Malone Bugg W-TN
 Brookins Campbell D-TN
 Davis Carpenter W-NY
 Ebenezer M. Chamberlain D-IN
 George W. Chase W-NY
 James Chrisman D-KY
 Alfred H. Colquitt D-GA
 John Parsons Cook W-IA
 Samuel L. Crocker W-MA
 Thomas W. Cumming D-NY
 Francis B. Cutting D-NY
 Thomas Davis D-RI
 William Barton Wade Dent D-GA
 Edward Dickinson W-MA
 Augustus Drum D-PA
 William Dunbar D-LA
 Norman Eddy D-IN
 J. Wiley Edmands W-MA
 Andrew Ellison D-OH
 William Everhart W-PA
 E. Wilder Farley W-ME
 John Rankin Franklin W-MD
 Wiley Pope Harris D-MS
 George Hastings D-NY
 Isaac Ellmaker Hiester W-PA
 Clement S. Hill W-KY
 Charles Hughes D-NY
 Theodore Gaillard Hunt W-LA
 Harvey H. Johnson D-OH
 Roland Jones D-LA
 John Kerr Jr. W-NC
 George W. Kittredge D-NH
 Alfred William Lamb D-MO
 James Henry Lane R-IN
 Milton Latham D-CA
 Charles S. Lewis D-VA
 Samuel Lilly D-NJ
 William D. Lindsley D-OH
 Caleb Lyon I-NY
 John B. Macy D-WI
 James Maurice D-NY
 Samuel Mayall D-ME
 John McCulloch W-PA
 James A. McDougall Union Democrat-CA
 Ner Middleswarth W-PA
 Henry Augustus Muhlenberg D-PA
 David A. Noble D-MI
 Jared V. Peck D-NY
 Rufus Wheeler Peckham D-NY
 Bishop Perkins D-NY
 John Perkins Jr. D-LA
 Philip Phillips D-AL
 James T. Pratt D-CT
 David Addison Reese W-GA
 Peter Rowe D-NY
 Samuel Lyon Russell W-PA
 Wilson Shannon D-OH
 Jacob Shower D-MD
 Gerrit Smith Free Soil-NY
 George W. Smyth D-TX
 John F. Snodgrass D-VA
 Hestor L. Stevens D-MI
 Andrew Stuart D-OH
 David Stuart D-MI
 Christian Markle Straub D-PA
 John J. Taylor D-NY
 Isaac Teller W-NY
 Andrew Tracy W-VT
 Michael Carver Trout D-PA
 William M. Tweed D-NY
 Charles Wentworth Upham W-MA
 Joshua Van Sant D-MD
 Hiram Walbridge D-NY
 William Adams Walker D-NY
 Samuel H. Walley W-MA
 Michael Walsh D-NY
 Tappan Wentworth W-MA
 Theodoric R. Westbrook D-NY
 William Henry Witte D-PA

34th Congress (1855–1857) 
 Thomas Peter Akers Know Nothing-MO
 Charles J. Albright Opposition-OH
 Lucien Barbour Indiana People's Party-IN
 David Barclay D-PA
 Hendley S. Bennett D-MS
 James Bishop Opposition-NJ
 Samuel Carey Bradshaw Opposition-PA
 Jacob Broom Know Nothing-PA
 John Cadwalader D-PA
 John P. Campbell Jr. Know Nothing-KY
 Thomas Child Jr. W-NY
 Bayard Clarke Opposition-NY
 Elisha D. Cullen Know Nothing-DE
 William Cumback Indiana People's Party-IN
 Jacob C. Davis D-IL
 Timothy C. Day Opposition-OH
 James W. Denver D-CA
 Samuel Dickson Opposition-NY
 Francis S. Edwards Know Nothing-NY
 Jonas R. Emrie Opposition-OH
 Lemuel D. Evans Know Nothing-TX
 Nathaniel Greene Foster Know Nothing-GA
 Samuel Galloway Opposition-OH
 William A. Gilbert Opposition-NY
 Augustus Hall D-IA
 Philemon T. Herbert D-CA
 George Tisdale Hodges R-VT
 Henry William Hoffman Know Nothing-MD
 David P. Holloway Indiana People's Party-IN
 Thomas R. Horton Opposition-NY
 Jonas A. Hughston Opposition-NY
 Rufus H. King Opposition-NY
 Jonathan Knight Opposition-PA
 Ebenezer Knowlton Opposition-ME
 William A. Lake Know Nothing-MS
 Alexander Keith Marshall Know Nothing-KY
 Andrew Z. McCarty Opposition-NY
 Killian Miller Opposition-NY
 Oscar F. Moore Opposition-OH
 James L. D. Morrison D-IL
 Robert Treat Paine - Know Nothing-NC
 John Jamison Pearce Opposition-PA
 George Washington Peck D-MI
 Guy R. Pelton Opposition-NY
 Edwin Godwin Reade Know Nothing-NC
 Thomas Rivers Know Nothing-TN
 David Fullerton Robison Opposition-PA
 Harvey D. Scott Opposition-IN
 William Henry Sneed American Party-TN
 James S. T. Stranahan Opposition-NY
 Samuel F. Swope American Party-KY
 James Thorington W-IA
 Mark Trafton Know Nothing-MA
 Job Roberts Tyson W-PA
 William Valk Know Nothing-NY
 Abram Wakeman W-NY
 Percy Walker Know Nothing-AL
 Cooper K. Watson Opposition-OH
 Hiram B. Warner D-GA
 William W. Welch American-CT
 Thomas R. Whitney Know Nothing-NY
 John Williams D-NY
 James Hutchinson Woodworth ID-IL

35th Congress (1857–1859) 
 Nehemiah Abbott R-ME
 John Alexander Ahl D-PA
 Samuel G. Andrews R-NY
 Samuel Arnold D-CT
 William D. Bishop D-CT
 Guy M. Bryan D-TX
 Joseph Burns D-OH
 James M. Cavanaugh D-MN
 Henry Chapman D-PA
 Joseph R. Cockerill D-OH
 James Brown Clay D-KY
 Timothy Davis R-IA
 William Lewis Dewart D-PA
 James Bradford Foley D-IN
 James Lisle Gillis D-PA
 Charles J. Gilman R-ME
 James M. Gregg D-IN
 William S. Groesbeck D-OH
 La Fayette Grover D-OR
 Lawrence W. Hall D-OH
 Israel T. Hatch D-NY
 Charles D. Hodges D-IL
 James Hughes D-IN
 John Huyler D-NJ
 Owen Jones D-PA
 William High Keim R-PA
 James Landy D-PA
 William Lawrence D-OH
 Paul Leidy D-PA
 Joseph C. McKibbin D-CA
 Joseph Miller D-OH
 John Gallagher Montgomery D-PA
 Oliver A. Morse R-NY
 William Wallace Phelps D-MN
 Henry Myer Phillips D-PA
 Wilson Reilly D-PA
 William Fiero Russell D-NY
 John A. Searing D-NY
 Judson W. Sherman R-NY
 George Taylor D-NY
 John Thompson R-NY
 Allison White D-PA
 Jacob R. Wortendyke D-NJ
 Augustus Romaldus Wright D-GA

36th Congress (1859–1861) 
 William Clayton Anderson Opposition-KY
 John D. Ashmore D-SC
 John Richard Barret D-MO
 Charles Lewis Beale R-NY
 Alexander Boteler Opposition-VA
 Reese Bowen Brabson Opposition-TN
 John Edward Bouligny American Party-LA
 Martin Butterfield R-NY
 John Chilton Burch D-CA
 John Carey R-OH
 Luther C. Carter R-NY
 David Clopton D-AL
 Stephen Coburn R-ME
 George B. Cooper D-MI
 Daniel Coleman DeJarnette Sr. Independent Democrat-VA
 Orris S. Ferry R-CT
 Ezra B. French R-ME
 James H. Graham R-NY
 Chapin Hall R-PA
 Andrew Jackson Hamilton Independent Democrat-TX
 Robert H. Hatton Opposition-TN
 William Helmick R-OH
 Thomas C. Hindman D-AR
 William Howard D-OH
 George Wurtz Hughes D-MD
 William Irvine R-NY
 James S. Jackson Unionist-KY
 John James Jones D-GA
 Benjamin Franklin Junkin R-PA
 William S. Kenyon R-NY
 John M. Landrum D-LA
 Charles H. Larrabee D-WI
 M. Lindley Lee R-NY
 Henry Clay Longnecker R-PA
 Peter Early Love D-GA
 Charles D. Martin D-OH
 Elbert S. Martin Independent Democrat-VA
 Jacob Kerlin McKenty D-PA
 Laban T. Moore Opposition-KY
 Thomas Amos Rogers Nelson Opposition-TN (elected to second term, but arrested by Confederate troops before he could take his seat)
 William Pennington R-NJ
 Roger Atkinson Pryor D-VA
 James L. Pugh D-AL
 James Minor Quarles Opposition-TN
 John Hazard Reynolds Anti-Lecompton Democrat-NY
 Jetur R. Riggs Anti-Lecompton Democrat-NJ
 Christopher Robinson R-RI
 John Schwartz Anti-Lecompton Democrat-PA
 William E. Simms D-KY
 William Nathan Harrell Smith Opposition-NC
 Daniel E. Somes R-ME
 Cyrus Spink R-OH
 Lansing Stout D-OR
 Thomas Clarke Theaker R-OH
 John W. H. Underwood D-GA
 Alfred Wells R-NY
 Morton S. Wilkinson R-MN
 John Wood R-PA

37th Congress (1861–1863) 
 Goldsmith Bailey R-MA
 Stephen Baker R-NY
 Charles John Biddle D-PA
 George Washington Bridges Unionist-TN
 George H. Browne D/Constitutional Union-RI
 Charles Benedict Calvert Unionist-MD
 Samuel L. Casey Unionist-KY
 Jacob P. Chamberlain R-NY
 Andrew Jackson Clements Unionist-TN
 George T. Cobb D-NJ
 Frederick A. Conkling R-NY
 Martin F. Conway R-KS
 Thomas Buchecker Cooper D-PA
 John J. Crittenden Unionist-KY
 William P. Cutler R-OH
 William Morris Davis R-PA
 Isaac C. Delaplaine D-NY
 Alexander S. Diven R-NY
 George W. Dunlap Unionist-KY
 Samuel C. Fessenden R-ME
 T. A. D. Fessenden R-ME
 George P. Fisher Unionist-DE
 Benjamin Flanders R-LA
 Richard Franchot R-NY
 John Noble Goodwin R-ME
 Bradley F. Granger R-MI
 Edward Haight D-NY
 Luther Hanchett R-WI
 Richard A. Harrison Unionist-OH
 James S. Jackson Unionist-KY
 James Kerrigan ID-NY
 Cornelius Leary Unionist-MD
 William Eckart Lehman D-PA
 Frederick Low R-CA
 John W. Menzies Unionist-KY
 William Mitchell R-IN
 Anson Morrill R-ME
 Elijah Hise Norton D-MO
 Robert H. Nugen D-OH
 Timothy Guy Phelps R-CA
 Thomas Lawson Price D-MO
 John William Reid D-MO
 Albert G. Riddle R-OH
 William Paine Sheffield Sr. Union-RI
 George K. Shiel D-OR
 Socrates N. Sherman R-NY
 A. Scott Sloan R-WI
 Edward H. Smith D-NY
 Andrew J. Thayer D-OR
 Benjamin Thomas Unionist-MA
 Charles H. Upton Unionist-VA
 Chauncey Vibbard D-NY
 Amasa Walker R-MA
 William Wall R-NY
 Charles W. Walton R-ME
 George Catlin Woodruff D-CT
 Samuel T. Worcester R-OH

38th Congress (1863–1865) 
 Lucien Anderson Unconditional Unionist-KY
 Augustus C. Baldwin D-MI
 James S. Brown D-WI
 Brutus J. Clay Unionist-KY
 Cornelius Cole R-CA
 John Creswell R-MD
 Joseph K. Edgerton D-IN
 John Ganson D-NY
 Henry W. Harrington D-IN
 Charles M. Harris D-IL
 Anson Herrick D-NY
 Wells A. Hutchins D-OH
 William Johnston D-OH
 Martin Kalbfleisch D-NY
 Francis Kernan D-NY
 Austin Augustus King D-MO
 Samuel Knox Unconditional Unionist-MO
 DeWitt Clinton Littlejohn R-NY
 Alexander Long D-OH
 Daniel Marcy D-NH
 Archibald McAllister D-PA
 John R. McBride R-OR
 James F. McDowell D-IN
 George Middleton D-NJ
 William Miller D-PA (Defeated Speaker Galusha Grow)
 Amos Myers R-PA
 Homer Augustus Nelson D-NY
 John O'Neill D-OH
 John Guier Scott D-MO
 Thomas Bowles Shannon R-CA
 Nathaniel B. Smithers Unconditional Unionist-DE
 Henry G. Stebbins D-NY
 Lorenzo De Medici Sweat D-ME
 William Temple D-DE
 Henry Wells Tracy IR-PA
 Ezra Wheeler D-WI
 Joseph W. White D-OH
 Abel Carter Wilder R-KS
 Henry G. Worthington R-NV

39th Congress (1865–1867) 
 Abraham Andrews Barker R-PA
 Teunis G. Bergen D-NY
 John Bidwell R-CA
 Edmund Cooper Unionist-TN
 Charles Vernon Culver R-PA
 William Augustus Darling R-NY
 Joseph H. Defrees R-IN
 William E. Dodge R-NY
 John Hanson Farquhar R-IN
 Roswell Hart R-NY
 James Henry Dickey Henderson R-OR
 Ralph Hill R-IN
 Elijah Hise D-KY
 John Hogan D-MO
 Sidney T. Holmes R-NY
 Demas Hubbard Jr. R-NY 
 Edwin N. Hubbell D-NY
 James Randolph Hubbell R-OH
 John W. Hunter D-NY
 Morgan Jones D-NY
 John R. Kelso IR-MO
 Andrew J. Kuykendall R-IL
 George R. Latham Unconditional Unionist-WV
 John W. Leftwich Unconditional Unionist-TN
 Turner M. Marquett R-NE
 Gilman Marston R-NH
 Donald C. McRuer R-CA
 William A. Newell R-NJ
 Henry Jarvis Raymond R-NY
 Burwell C. Ritter D-KY
 Lovell Rousseau Unconditional Unionist-KY
 George S. Shanklin D-KY
 Thomas N. Stilwell R-IN
 Nelson Taylor D-NY
 John Lewis Thomas Jr. Unconditional Unionist-MD
 Anthony Thornton D-IL
 Andrew H. Ward D-KY
 Samuel L. Warner R-CT
 Edwin R. V. Wright D-NJ

40th Congress (1867–1869) 
 Demas Barnes D-NY
 W. Jasper Blackburn R-LA
 John Benton Callis R-AL
 Samuel Fenton Cary IR-OH
 Joseph W. Clift R-GA
 Manuel S. Corley R-SC
 Grenville M. Dodge R-IA
 William P. Edwards R-GA
 James T. Elliott R-AR
 William C. Fields R-NY
 Darwin Abel Finney R-PA
 John R. French R-NC
 James H. Goss R-SC
 Samuel F. Gove R-GA
 Joseph J. Gravely R-MO
 Asa Grover D-KY
 Cornelius S. Hamilton R-OH
 Thomas Haughey R-AL
 James M. Hinds R-AR
 Julius Hotchkiss D-CT
 Richard D. Hubbard D-CT
 Bethuel Kitchen R-WV
 William S. Lincoln R-NY
 Rufus Mallory R-OR
 James Mann D-LA
 Turner M. Marquette R-NE
 John Moffet D-PA
 James Mullins R-TN
 Carman A. Newcomb R-MO
 Benjamin W. Norris R-AL
 Solomon Newton Pettis R-PA
 Charles Wilson Pierce R-AL
 William A. Pile R-MO
 Daniel Polsley R-WV
 Charles H. Prince R-GA
 Green Berry Raum R-IL
 William H. Robertson R-NY
 Lewis Selye R-NY
 Thomas E. Stewart Conservative Republican-NY
 John Hubler Stover R-MO
 Nelson Tift D-GA
 John Trimble R-TN
 Michel Vidal R-LA

41st Congress (1869–1871) 
 William Hepburn Armstrong R-PA
 Joel Funk Asper R-MO
 David Atwood R-WI
 Richard S. Ayer R-VA
 David S. Bennett R-NY
 Marion Bethune R-GA
 George Booker Conservative-VA
 Alfred Eliab Buck R-AL
 Hervey C. Calkin D-NY
 Orestes Cleveland D-NJ
 Stephen A. Corker D-GA
 George W. Cowles R-NY
 Noah Davis R-NY
 Edward Degener R-TX
 Edward F. Dickinson D-OH
 Joseph Dixon R-NC
 Joseph Benton Donley R-PA
 Isaac H. Duval R-WV
 David Patterson Dyer R-MO
 John Fisher R-NY
 Thomas Fitch R-NV
 James K. Gibson Conservative-VA
 Calvin Willard Gilfillan R-PA
 George Woodward Greene D-NY
 John Ashley Griswold D-NY
 Patrick Hamill D-MD
 Robert S. Heflin R-AL
 Truman H. Hoag D-OH
 Charles H. Holmes R-NY
 Charles Knapp R-NY
 Jefferson F. Long R-GA
 John Manning Jr. D-NC
 William Milnes Jr. Conservative-VA
 Samuel P. Morrill R-ME
 Eliakim H. Moore R-OH
 William W. Paine D-GA
 Darwin Phelps R-PA
 Charles Pomeroy R-IA
 William Farrand Prosser R-TN
 John Roberts Reading D-PA
 Henry Augustus Reeves D-NY
 Robert Ridgway Conservative-VA
 Anthony A. C. Rogers D-AR
 Stephen Sanford R-NY
 William Crawford Sherrod D-AL
 Joseph Showalter Smith D-OR
 William Jay Smith R-TN
 William Smyth R-IA
 Peter W. Strader D-OH
 Randolph Strickland R-MI
 William N. Sweeney D-KY
 Adolphus H. Tanner R-NY
 Lewis Tillman R-TN
 George W. Whitmore R-TX
 Morton S. Wilkinson R-MN
 Eugene McLanahan Wilson D-MN
 James J. Winans R-OH
 John Witcher R-WV
 William P. Wolf R-IA

42nd Congress (1871–1873) 
 Ephraim Leister Acker D-PA
 Erasmus W. Beck D-GA
 John Lourie Beveridge R-IL
 John S. Bigby R-GA
 James G. Blair Liberal Republican-MO
 Alexander Boarman Liberal Republican-LA
 Elliott M. Braxton D-VA
 Robert Porter Caldwell D-TN
 John M. Carroll D-NY
 John M. Coghlan R-CA
 John V. Creely R-PA
 John Critcher D-VA
 Robert C. De Large R-SC
 Ozro J. Dodds D-OH
 Dudley M. DuBose D-GA
 John Edwards LR-AR
 Constantine C. Esty R-MA
 Moses W. Field R-MI
 Samuel C. Forker D-NJ
 Abraham Ellison Garrett D-TN
 Edward Isaac Golladay D-TN
 Milo Goodrich R-NY
 Samuel Griffith D-PA
 William Handley D-AL
 James M. Hanks D-AR
 James C. Harper D-NC
 Ellery Albee Hibbard D-NH
 Andrew King D-MO
 Thomas Kinsella D-NY
 Archibald T. MacIntyre D-GA
 Mahlon Dickerson Manson D-IN
 James McCleery R-LA
 William McClelland D-PA
 Henry D. McHenry D-KY
 William Matthews Merrick D-MD
 Benjamin Franklin Meyers D-PA
 Silas L. Niblack D-FL
 Aaron F. Perry R-OH
 Elizur H. Prindle R-NY
 Edward Y. Rice D-IL
 John Ritchie D-MD
 John Rogers D-NY
 Robert Roosevelt D-NY
 John E. Seeley R-NY
 Henry Sherwood D-PA
 James H. Slater D-OR
 Henry Snapp R-IL
 Thomas J. Speer R-GA
 Bradford N. Stevens D-IL
 Jabez G. Sutherland D-MI
 Benjamin S. Turner R-AL
 Joseph H. Tuthill D-NY
 William Wirt Vaughan D-TN
 Seth Wakeman R-NY
 Madison Miner Walden R-IA
 Joseph M. Warren D-NY
 William Williams D-NY

43rd Congress (1873–1875) 
 William Albert R-MD
 Charles Albright R-PA
 Granville Barrere R-IL
 Josiah Begole D-MI
 John Berry D-OH
 James Soloman Biery R-PA
 Rees Bowen D-VA
 Frederick George Bromberg LR-AL
 Lewis C. Carpenter R-SC
 Amos Clark Jr. R-NJ
 Charles Clayton R-CA
 Isaac Clements R-IL
 Stephen A. Cobb R-KS
 Franklin Corwin R-IL
 Philip S. Crooke R-NY
 William Crutchfield R-TN
 Alexander Davis D-VA
 David M. De Witt D-NY
 Moses W. Field R-MI
 James C. Freeman R-GA
 Lewis B. Gunckel R-OH
 John Hagans R-WV
 Horace Harrison R-TN
 Samuel F. Hersey R-ME
 Ebenezer R. Hoar R-MA
 Asa Hodges R-AR
 Albert R. Howe R-MS
 Ira B. Hyde R-MO
 William Joseph Hynes LR-AR
 Hugh J. Jewett D-OH
 Lloyd Lowndes Jr. R-MD
 Effingham Lawrence D-LA
 John D. Lawson R-NY
 Barbour Lewis R-TN
 James R. Lofland R-DE
 John Alexander Magee D-PA
 James Stewart Martin R-IL
 Alexander S. McDill R-WI
 William P. McLean D-TX
 John McNulta R-IL
 David B. Mellish R-NY
 William S. Moore R-PA
 James Nesmith D-OR
 Jason Niles R-MS
 Richard C. Parsons R-OH
 Charles Pelham R-AL
 Harris M. Plaisted R-ME
 Austin F. Pike R-NH
 Alonzo J. Ransier R-SC
 James T. Rapier R-AL
 Morgan Rawls D-GA
 William H. Ray R-IL
 John Blake Rice R-IL
 Hiram Lawton Richmond R-PA
 James Wallace Robinson R-OH
 Henry B. Sayler R-IN
 Richard Schell D-NY
 Henry Joel Scudder R-NY
 Isaac W. Scudder R-NJ
 James Beverley Sener R-VA
 Charles Christopher Sheats R-AL
 George A. Sheridan Liberal Republican-LA
 Andrew Sloan R-GA
 Edwin O. Stanard R-MO
 Elisha Standiford D-KY
 William B. Small R-NH
 James S. Smart R-NY
 George Luke Smith R-LA
 John Ambler Smith R-VA
 John Quincy Smith R-OH
 William Alexander Smith R-NC
 Charles A. Stevens R-MA
 James Dale Strawbridge R-PA
 Alexander Wilson Taylor R-PA
 Christopher Thomas R-VA
 Lyman Tremain R-NY
 John L. Vance D-OH
 Jasper D. Ward R-IL
 Marcus Lawrence Ward R-NJ
 Thomas Whitehead D-VA
 William Whiting R-MA
 John M. S. Williams R-MA
 Asa H. Willie D-TX
 Ephraim King Wilson II D-MD
 Joseph G. Wilson R-OR
 Simeon K. Wolfe D-IN
 Stewart L. Woodford R-NY
 John Duncan Young D-KY

44th Congress (1875–1877) 
 Josiah Gardner Abbott D-MA
 Charles Henry Adams R-NY
 Lucien Lester Ainsworth D-IA
 William B. Anderson I-IL
 John C. Bagby D-IL
 Taul Bradford R-AL
 William Ripley Brown R-KS
 Samuel D. Burchard D-WI
 Charles W. Buttz R-SC
 Alexander Campbell R-IL
 Nathan T. Carr D-IN
 George W. Cate R-WI
 Chester W. Chapin D-MA
 Alexander Gilmore Cochran D-PA
 Jacob Pitzer Cowan D-OH
 John M. Davy R-NY
 Rezin A. De Bolt D-MO
 George H. Durand D-MI
 Albert Gallatin Egbert D-PA
 David Dudley Field II D-NY
 Samuel McClary Fite D-TN
 Edwin Flye R-ME
 Rufus S. Frost R-MA
 John R. Goodin D-KS
 Jeremiah Haralson R-AL
 William S. Haymond D-IN
 Benjamin Harvey Hill D-GA
 Andrew Humphreys D-IN
 John Adams Hyman R-NC
 George A. Jenks D-PA
 Edward C. Kehr D-MO
 Winthrop Welles Ketcham R-PA
 Alanson M. Kimball R-WI
 William S. King R-MN
 George Augustus La Dow D-OR
 Franklin Landers D-IN
 Lafayette Lane D-OR
 Elias W. Leavenworth R-NY
 Scott Lord D-NY
 William McFarland D-TN
 John V. Le Moyne D-IL
 William M. Levy D-LA
 Lloyd Lowndes Jr. R-MD
 Henry S. Magoon R-WI
 Edwin R. Meade D-NY
 Henry B. Metcalfe D-NY
 Charles E. Nash R-LA
 Nelson I. Norton R-NY
 Nathaniel H. Odell D-NY
 Edward Y. Parsons D-KY
 Henry B. Payne D-OH
 William Adam Piper D-CA
 Harris M. Plaisted R-ME
 Earley F. Poppleton D-OH
 Allen Potter D-MI
 Joseph Powell D-PA
 John Reilly D-PA
 John S. Savage D-OH
 Julius Hawley Seelye I-MA
 James Sheakley D-PA
 William B. Spencer D-LA
 William Henry Stanton D-PA
 John K. Tarbox D-MA
 Frederick Halstead Teese D-NJ
 Charles Perkins Thompson D-MA
 John Q. Tufts R-IA
 Charles C. B. Walker D-NY
 Ansel T. Walling D-OH
 William W. Warren D-MA
 Guilford Wiley Wells IR-MS
 Richard H. Whiting R-IL
 James D. Williams D-IN
 Alan Wood Jr. R-PA

45th Congress (1877–1879) 
 William J. Bacon R-NY
 Lorenzo Brentano R-IL
 Curtis Hooks Brogden R-NC
 Solomon Bundy R-NY
 Theodore Weld Burdick R-IA
 Nathan Cole R-MO
 Jacob Dolson Cox R-OH
 Henry J. B. Cummings R-IA
 Benjamin Dean D-MA
 Anthony Eickhoff D-NY
 Charles C. Ellsworth R-MI
 William Bennett Fleming D-GA
 Mills Gardner R-OH
 William Willis Garth D-AL
 John Hanna R-IN
 Elizur K. Hart D-NY
 John N. Hungerford R-NY
 Anthony F. Ittner R-MO
 John S. Jones R-OH
 Edwin W. Keightley R-MI
 William Lathrop R-IL
 John E. Leonard R-LA
 Robert F. Ligon D-AL
 Thomas Jefferson Majors R-NE
 Lyne Metcalfe R-MO
 George W. Patterson R-NY
 Thomas M. Patterson D-CO
 Thomas Baldwin Peddie R-NJ
 Henry Moses Pollard R-MO
 Auburn Pridemore D-VA
 John H. Pugh R-NJ
 Terence J. Quinn D-NY
 James Henry Randolph R-TN
 Leonidas Sexton R-IN
 Jacob H. Stewart R-MN
 Joseph Champlin Stone R-IA
 Thomas F. Tipton R-IL
 William D. Veeder D-NY
 Henry Watterson D-KY
 Frank Welch R-NE
 Michael D. White R-IN
 Richard Williams R-OR
 Thomas Wren R-NV
 J. Smith Young D-LA

46th Congress (1879–1881) 
 Reuben Knecht Bachman D-PA
 Hiram Barber Jr. R-IL
 John L. Blake R-NJ
 Bradley Barlow Greenback-VT
 Lewis A. Brigham R-NJ
 Newton Nash Clements D-AL
 Calvin Cowgill R-IN
 Rollin M. Daggett R-NV
 Gilbert De La Matyr Greenback-IN
 Samuel Bernard Dick R-PA
 Edwin Einstein R-NY
 Evarts Worcester Farr R-NH
 John W. Ferdon R-NY
 Albert P. Forsythe Greenback-IL
 Edward H. Gillette Greenback-IA
 Abraham J. Hostetler D-IN
 Noble A. Hull D-FL
 Joseph E. Johnston D-VA
 William H. Kitchin D-NC
 Alfred Morrison Lay D-MO
 William Lounsbery D-NY
 Joseph John Martin R-NC
 William R. Myers D-IN
 John Stoughton Newberry R-MI
 James O'Brien D-NY
 Daniel O'Reilly ID-NY
 James H. Osmer R-PA
 Henry Persons ID-GA
 Ray V. Pierce R-NY
 Henry Poehler D-MN
 James Buchanan Richmond D-VA
 Gideon F. Rothwell D-MO
 Daniel Lindsay Russell R/Greenback-NC
 John Walker Ryon D-PA
 William J. Samford D-AL
 Samuel Locke Sawyer ID-MO
 Hezekiah Bradley Smith D-NJ
 Robert Love Taylor D-TN
 Charles H. Voorhis R-NJ
 James Richard Waddill D-MO
 John Whiteaker D-OR
 Seth Hartman Yocum Greenback-PA

47th Congress (1881–1883) 
 Thomas Allen D-MO
 George Robinson Black D-GA
 Joseph Henry Burrows Greenback-MO
 Andrew Grant Chapman D-MD
 Rufus Dawes R-OH
 John F. Dezendorf D-VA
 Mark L. De Motte R-IN
 Charles T. Doxey R-IN
 P. Henry Dugro D-NY
 Sewall S. Farwell R-IA
 Abram Fulkerson D-VA
 Henry S. Harris D-NJ
 Ira Sherwin Hazeltine Greenback-MO
 John B. Hoge D-WV
 Orlando Hubbs R-NC
 Ferris Jacobs Jr. R-NY
 Cornelius Comegys Jadwin R-PA
 Phineas Jones R-NJ
 John P. Leedom D-OH
 John H. Lewis R-IL
 Henry W. Lord R-MI
 James Henry McLean R-MO
 William Robert Moore R-TN
 James Mosgrove Greenback-PA
 Michael N. Nolan D-NY
 Robert B. F. Peirce R-IN
 John B. Rice R-OH
 Theron Moses Rice Greenbacker-MO
 John Treadway Rich R-MI
 James M. Ritchie R-OH
 John Williams Shackelford D-NC
 Emanuel Shultz R-OH
 Gustavus Sessinghaus R-MO
 Dietrich C. Smith R-IL
 J. Hyatt Smith I-NY
 Oliver L. Spaulding R-MI
 Robert Jarvis Cochran Walker R-PA
 George W. Webber R-MI

48th Congress (1883–1885) 
 Armstead M. Alexander D-MO
 Samuel Myron Brainerd R-PA
 John Bratton D-SC
 Edward Breitung R-MI
 Francis B. Brewer R-NY
 James Broadhead D-MO
 James Budd D-CA
 James Franklin Clay D-KY
 Daniel W. Connolly D-PA
 John Cosgrove D-MO
 George Henry Craig R-AL
 William Wirt Culbertson R-KY
 Nathan F. Dixon III R-RI
 William Dorsheimer D-NY
 Charles T. Doxey R-IN
 William Addison Duncan D-PA
 William W. Eaton D-CT
 Mortimer Fitzland Elliott D-PA
 Reuben Ellwood R-IL
 William E. English D-IN
 Thomas M. Ferrell D-NJ
 William H. F. Fiedler D-NJ
 John F. Finerty ID-IL
 John F. Follett D-OH
 John R. Glascock D-CA
 Alexander Graves D-MO
 Alphonso Hart R-OH
 Herschel H. Hatch R-MI
 Hart Benton Holton R-MD
 Benjamin Stephen Hooper Readjuster-VA
 Julius Houseman D-MI
 Benjamin Franklin Howey R-NJ
 Carleton Hunt D-LA
 Elza Jeffords R-MS
 Burr W. Jones D-WI
 Isaac M. Jordan D-OH
 William Pitt Kellogg R-LA
 John Edward Lamb D-IN
 Edward T. Lewis D-LA
 Theodore Lyman III IR-MA
 Robert Murphy Mayo Readjuster-VA
 John W. McCormick R-OH
 Robert Maynard Murray D-OH
 Thomas P. Ochiltree I-TX
 David R. Paige D-OH
 John Denniston Patton D-PA
 Walter F. Pool R-NC
 George Adams Post D-PA
 Orlando B. Potter D-NY
 Luke Pryor D-AL
 William Henry Mills Pusey D-IA
 William Findlay Rogers D-NY
 Hiram Y. Smith R-IA
 Robert S. Stevens D-NY
 Charles A. Sumner D-CA
 Daniel H. Sumner D-WI
 Pleasant B. Tully D-CA
 Thomas J. Van Alstyne D-NY
 Jonathan H. Wallace D-OH
 Luman Hamlin Weller Greenback-IA
 John Winans D-WI
 Edward Wemple D-NY
 John Sergeant Wise Readjuster-VA
 Thomas Jefferson Wood D-IN
 Gilbert M. Woodward D-WI
 George L. Yaple D-MI
 Tyre York ID-NC

49th Congress (1885–1887) 
 Charles Marley Anderson D-OH
 James Dennis Brady R-VA
 William Hinson Cole D-MD
 Charles C. Comstock D-MI
 Thomas Croxton D-VA
 John W. Daniel D-VA
 William Dawson D-MO
 Nathan F. Dixon III R-RI
 Abraham Dowdney D-NY
 William W. Ellsberry D-OH
 Frederick D. Ely R-MA
 George Washington Fleeger R-PA
 George Ford D-IN
 Benjamin T. Frederick D-IA
 John Gilfillan R-MN
 Robert Stockton Green D-NJ
 John Blackwell Hale D-MO
 Benton Jay Hall D-IA
 Alfred Briggs Irion D-LA
 James Girard Lindsley R-NY
 James A. Louttit R-CA
 Henry Markham R-CA
 John Mason Martin D-AL
 Hugh H. Price R-WI
 Joseph Pulitzer D-NY
 Thomas William Sadler D-AL
 John Swinburne R-NY
 Isaac H. Taylor R-OH
 Zachary Taylor R-TN
 Connally Findlay Trigg D-VA
 Egbert Ludovicus Viele D-NY
 Nathaniel D. Wallace D-LA
 James Hugh Ward D-IL
 Alexander Colwell White R-PA

50th Congress (1887–1889) 
 Albert R. Anderson IR-IA
 George A. Anderson D-IL
 Samuel T. Baird D-LA
 John Robert Brown R-VA
 Lloyd Bryce D-NY
 Edward Burnett D-MA
 George W. Crouse R-OH
 Carlos French D-CT
 William E. Gaines R-VA
 Miles T. Granger D-CT
 Edward W. Greenman D-NY
 Norman Hall D-PA
 Charles E. Hogg D-WV
 Samuel I. Hopkins Labor-VA
 Stephen T. Hopkins R-NY
 Alvin Peterson Hovey R-IN
 Nicholas T. Kane D-NY
 John Lynch D-PA
 John L. MacDonald D-MN
 James Thompson Maffett R-PA
 Welty McCullogh R-PA
 John A. McShane D-NE
 Cherubusco Newton D-LA
 John Nichols I-NC
 Francis B. Posey R-IN
 Edmund Rice D-MN
 Edward White Robertson D-LA
 John E. Russell D-MA
 Henry W. Seymour R-MI
 Furnifold McLendel Simmons D-NC
 Henry Smith Labor-WI
 George M. Thomas R-KY
 Thomas Larkin Thompson D-CA
 Robert J. Vance D-CT
 James Bain White R-IN
 Stephen V. White R-NY
 Thomas Wilson D-MN

51st Congress (1889–1891) 
 George W. Atkinson R-WV
 Charles D. Beckwith R-NJ
 Aaron T. Bliss R-MI
 Thomas H. Carter R-MT
 Thomas J. Clunie D-CA
 Hamilton D. Coleman R-LA
 Solomon Comstock R-MN
 William James Connell R-MO
 Samuel Alfred Craig R-PA
 William Constantine Culbertson R-PA
 John J. De Haven R-CA
 Henry Clay Evans R-TN
 Hamilton G. Ewart R-NC
 Lewis P. Featherstone Labor-AR
 Frank T. Fitzgerald D-NY
 Nathan Frank R-MO
 Oscar S. Gifford R-SD
 Frederic T. Greenhalge R-MA
 Darwin Hall R-MN
 Henry C. Hansbrough R-ND
 Edward R. Hays R-IA
 Charles A. Hill R-IL
 James M. Jackson D-WV
 Harrison Kelley R-KS
 James Kerr D-PA
 William Medcalf Kinsey R-MO
 Charles J. Knapp R-NY
 John Mercer Langston R-VA
 Frederick Lansing R-NY
 Gilbert L. Laws R-NE
 John H. McCarthy D-NY
 Myron H. McCord R-WI
 John Van McDuffie R-AL
 Thomas E. Miller R-SC
 Orren C. Moore R-NH
 Frederick G. Niedringhaus R-MO
 Alonzo Nute R-NH
 John Quinn D-NY
 Joseph Warren Ray R-PA
 Joseph Rea Reed R-IA
 William E. Simonds R-CT
 Charles Brooks Smith R-WV
 Samuel Snider R-MN
 Moses D. Stivers R-NY
 Henry Stockbridge Jr. R-MD
 Willis Sweet R-ID
 Joseph Henry Sweney R-IA
 Charles Champlain Townsend R-PA
 Charles Henry Turner D-NY
 Richard Vaux D-PA
 Edward Carrington Venable D-VA
 Edmund Waddill Jr. R-VA
 Rodney Wallace R-MA
 William C. Wallace R-NY
 Frank W. Wheeler R-MI
 John M. Wiley D-NY
 Robert Henry Whitelaw D-MO

52nd Congress (1891–1893) 
 Lemuel Amerman D-PA
 Edwin Le Roy Antony D-TX
 Clinton Babbitt D-WI
 Joseph H. Beeman D-MS
 Henry Wilbur Bentley D-NY
 David A. Boody D-NY
 Thomas Bowman D-IA
 John Brewer Brown D-MD
 Thomas L. Bunting D-NY
 Samuel T. Busey D-IL
 Allen R. Bushnell D-WI
 Walter Halben Butler D-IA
 Samuel Byrns D-MO
 Benjamin T. Cable D-IL
 James Castle D-MN
 Alfred C. Chapin D-NY
 Benjamin H. Clover Populist-KS
 Isaac N. Cox D-NY
 John Crawford Crosby D-MA
 John T. Cutting R-CA
 Frank P. Coburn D-WI
 Frederick S. Coolidge D-MA
 Alexander Kerr Craig D-PA
 Warren F. Daniell D-NH
 William W. Dixon D-MT
 Robert E. Doan R-OH
 James I. Dungan D-OH
 Robert W. Everett D-GA
 John Rankin Gamble R-SD
 Martin K. Gantz D-OH
 Eugene Pierce Gillespie D-PA
 Levi T. Griffin D-MI
 Edwin Hallowell D-PA
 Kittel Halvorson Populist-MN
 John Taylor Hamilton D-IA
 William H. Harries D-MN
 Sherman Hoar D-MA
 George Johnstone D-SC
 John L. Jolley R-SD
 John W. Kendall D-KY
 John W. Lawson D-VA
 Joseph J. Little D-NY
 John Benjamin Long D-TX
 John James McDannold D-IL
 Edward F. McDonald D-NJ
 Lucas M. Miller D-WI
 John L. Mitchell D-WI
 Walter C. Newberry D-IL
 Lewis P. Ohliger D-OH
 John G. Otis Populist-KS
 Henry Page D-MD
 John M. Pattison D-OH
 David Henry Patton D-IN
 Hosea H. Rockwell D-NY
 Leslie W. Russell R-NY
 Owen Scott D-IL
 John Joseph Seerley D-IA
 George Washington Shonk R-PA
 Herman W. Snow D-IL
 Eli T. Stackhouse D-SC
 Lewis Steward D-IL
 Andrew Stewart R-PA
 Byron G. Stout D-MI
 Vincent A. Taylor R-OH
 George Van Horn D-NY
 John G. Warwick D-OH
 Thomas E. Watson Populist-GA
 Harrison H. Wheeler D-MI
 Frederick Edward White D-IA
 Archibald Hunter Arrington Williams D-NC
 George F. Williams D-MA
 Thomas E. Winn D-GA
 Henry M. Youmans D-MI

53rd Congress (1893–1895) 
 Silas Adams R-KY
 Melvin Baldwin D-MN
 Lyman E. Barnes D-WI
 William M. Beckner D-KY
 John C. Black D-IL
 Haldor Boen Populist-MN
 William H. Bower D-NC
 Robert Franklin Brattan D-MD
 Daniel Dee Burnes D-MO
 Thomas Banks Cabaniss D-GA
 Marion Cannon Populist-CA
 Robert A. Childs R-IL
 Henry A. Coffeen D-WY
 Charles G. Conn D-IN
 Johnston Cornish D-NJ
 William Henry Denson D-AL
 John T. Dunn D-NJ
 Warren B. English D-CA
 William Everett D-MA
 George Bragg Fielder D-NJ
 Benjamin F. Funk R-IL
 Julius Goldzier D-IL
 John H. Graham D-NY
 Walter Gresham D-TX
 Levi T. Griffin D-MI
 Charles Delemere Haines D-NY
 Thomas Hammond D-IN
 Winder Laird Henry D-MD
 Thomas Jefferson Hudson Populist-KS
 William Alexander Harris Populist-KS
 Joseph C. Hendrix D-NY
 Winder Henry D-MD
 William Henry Hines D-PA
 George P. Ikirt D-OH
 James F. Izlar D-SC
 Edwin J. Jorden R-PA
 William Lilly R-PA
 Marcus C. Lisle D-KY
 William V. Lucas R-SD
 James William Marshall D-VA
 Francis Marvin R-NY
 John James McDannold D-IL
 Alexander McDowell R-PA
 Michael J. McEttrick D-MA
 William F. McNagny D-IN
 John W. Moon R-MI
 Horace Ladd Moore D-KS
 Thomas M. Paschal D-TX
 Lafe Pence Populist-CO
 James P. Pigott D-CT
 James A. D. Richards D-OH
 George F. Richardson D-MI
 Byron F. Ritchie D-OH
 William Ryan D-NY
 Simon J. Schermerhorn D-NY
 George B. Shaw R-WI
 Peter J. Somers D-WI
 Isidor Straus D-NY
 Arthur H. Taylor D-IN
 William L. Ward R-NY
 Owen A. Wells D-WI
 Hamilton K. Wheeler R-IL
 William J. White R-OH

54th Congress (1895–1897) 
 Truman H. Aldrich R-AL
 Clarence Emir Allen R-UT
 William Coleman Anderson R-TN
 Harrison Henry Atwood R-MA
 Frank S. Black R-NY
 Richard W. Blue R-KS
 Foster V. Brown R-TN
 Charles F. Buck D-LA
 Orlando Burrell R-IL
 Charles Germman Burton R-MO
 Charles Nelson Clark R-MO
 Samuel A. Cook R-WI
 John Kissig Cowen D-MD
 Miles Crowley D-TX
 George Calhoun Crowther R-MO
 Walter M. Denny D-MS
 Francis B. De Witt R-OH
 Finis E. Downing D-IL
 Tazewell Ellett D-VA
 Albert Taylor Goodwyn Populist-AL
 Frank Hanly R-IN
 Alexander M. Hardy R-IN
 Stephen Ross Harris R-OH
 Frederick Halterman R-PA
 Joseph Johnson Hart D-PA
 Jethro A. Hatch R-IN
 John Kerr Hendrick D-KY
 Nathan T. Hopkins R-KY
 Joel Douglas Hubbard R-MO
 James Hall Huling R-WV
 Samuel C. Hyde R-WA
 Grove L. Johnson R-CA
 Snyder S. Kirkpatrick R-KS
 Fred Churchill Leonard R-PA
 Jacob D. Leighty R-IN
 John Leisenring R-PA
 John W. Lewis R-KY
 James A. Lockhart D-NC
 John E. McCall R-TN
 Richard Cunningham McCormick R-NY
 William Robertson McKenney D-VA
 Joshua Weldon Miles D-MD
 Orrin Larrabee Miller R-KS
 Alfred Milnes R-MI
 Henry C. Miner D-NY
 Norman Adolphus Mozley R-MO
 Everett J. Murphy R-IL
 George H. Noonan R-TX
 William Claiborne Owens D-KY
 Theodore L. Poole R-NY
 Thomas S. Plowman R-AL
 John Henry Raney R-MO
 Frederick Remann R-IL
 John I. Rinaker R-IL
 John G. Shaw D-NC
 James G. Spencer D-MS
 James Alonzo Stahle R-PA
 Charles Phelps Taft R-OH
 Robert J. Tracewell R-IN
 John Plank Tracey R-MO
 William M. Treloar R-MO
 Robert T. Van Horn R-MO
 James J. Walsh D-NY
 David K. Watson R-OH
 George L. Wellington R-MD
 Jonathan S. Willis R-DE
 Benson Wood R-IL
 Charles W. Woodman R-IL
 Charles Henderson Yoakum D-TX

55th Congress (1897–1899) 
 Isaac Ambrose Barber R-MD
 Charles A. Barlow Populist-CA
 Samuel J. Barrows R-MA
 Joseph M. Belford R-NY
 George Jacob Benner D-PA
 Robert N. Bodine D-MO
 William Samuel Booze R-MD
 Jeremiah D. Botkin Populist-KS
 Ferdinand Brucker D-MI
 James R. Campbell D-IL
 Curtis H. Castle Populist-CA
 George M. Davison R-KY
 Charles Dorr R-WV
 John Edgar Fowler Populist-NC
 James Gunn Populist-ID
 William F. L. Hadley R-IL
 L. Irving Handy D-DE
 William H. Hinrichsen D-IL
 William Carey Jones Silver Republican-WA
 John Edward Kelley Populist-SD
 William Sebring Kirkpatrick R-PA
 Freeman Knowles Populist-SD
 J. Hamilton Lewis D-WA
 William F. Love D-MS
 George A. Marshall D-OH
 Samuel Maxwell Populist-NE
 Nelson B. McCormick Populist-KS
 John McDonald R-MD
 William Watson McIntire R-MD
 Daniel W. Mills R-IL
 John Osborne D-WY
 Mason S. Peters Populist-KS
 Thomas S. Plowman D-AL
 John Cirby Sturtevant R-PA
 William V. Sullivan D-MS
 Albert M. Todd D-MI
 John H. G. Vehslage D-NY
 William D. Vincent Populist-KS
 Morgan B. Williams R-PA

56th Congress (1899–1901) 
 John Wilbur Atwater Populist-NC
 Willis J. Bailey R-KS
 Laird Howard Barber D-PA
 Albert J. Campbell D-MT
 William A. Chanler D-NY
 Bertram Tracy Clayton D-NY
 Thomas Cusack D-IL
 William Davis Daly D-NJ
 Stanley Woodward Davenport D-PA
 Jonathan P. Dolliver R-IA
 Romeo H. Freer R-WV
 Athelston Gaston D-PA
 June Ward Gayle D-KY
 Martin H. Glynn D-NY
 John H. Hoffecker R-DE
 Walter O. Hoffecker R-DE
 David Emmons Johnston D-WV
 Josiah Kerr R-MD
 Joseph R. Lane R-IA
 Mitchell May D-NY
 Smith McPherson R-IA
 Edward Thomas Noonan D-IL
 James M. E. O'Grady R-NY
 Fremont O. Phillips R-OH
 Julian Quarles D-VA
 Daniel J. Riordan D-NY
 James Wilfrid Ryan D-PA
 Albert D. Shaw R-NY (Re-elected to 57th Congress, died before convening of first session)
 John Walter Smith D-MD
 Joseph Earlston Thropp R-PA
 Oscar Turner D-KY
 John Q. Underhill D-NY
 Russell J. Waters R-CA
 Edward Danner Ziegler D-PA

57th Congress (1901–1903) 
 Henry H. Aplin R-MI
 L. Heisler Ball R-DE
 Oliver Belmont D-NY
 Alexander Billmeyer D-PA
 Henry Bristow R-NY
 Joseph A. Conry D-MA
 Frank Coombs R-CA
 Caldwell Edwards Populist-MT
 John J. Feely D-IL
 De Witt C. Flanagan D-NJ
 Thomas L. Glenn Populist-ID
 Curtis Gregg D-PA
 Harry A. Hanbury R-NY
 Pat Henry D-MS
 Harvey Samuel Irwin R-KY
 Alfred Metcalf Jackson D-KS
 Fred J. Kern D-IL
 Montague Lessler R-NY
 Robert Jacob Lewis R-PA
 J. Ross Mickey D-IL
 James M. Moody R-NC
 J. McKenzie Moss R-KY
 Cornelius Amory Pugsley D-NY
 John N. W. Rumple R-IA
 Charles Reginald Schirm R-MD
 Thomas J. Selby D-IL
 Frederic Storm R-NY
 George Sutherland R-UT
 Edward Swann D-NY
 Emmett Tompkins R-OH
 George Chester Robinson Wagoner R-MO
 James Bamford White D-KY
 Dudley G. Wooten D-TX

58th Congress (1903–1905) 
 De Witt C. Badger D-OH
 Robert Baker D-NY
 Edward Bassett D-NY
 Theodore A. Bell D-CA
 Allan Benny D-NJ
 James W. Brown IR-PA
 George W. Croft D-SC
 Theodore G. Croft D-SC
 Milton J. Daniels R-CA
 Charles Heber Dickerman D-PA
 Martin Emerich D-IL
 Morgan Cassius Fitzpatrick D-TN
 Henry A. Houston D-DE
 George Howell D-PA
 Amos H. Jackson R-OH
 William M. Lanning R-NJ
 Edward J. Livernash D/Union Labor-CA
 Alfred Lucking D-MI
 Norton P. Otis R-NY
 Henry Kirke Porter IR-PA
 Ira E. Rider D-NY
 George Shiras III IR-PA
 Francis Emanuel Shober D-NY
 Joseph Horace Shull D-PA
 George J. Smith R-NY
 Martin Joseph Wade D-IA
 William J. Wynn D-CA

59th Congress (1905–1907) 
 Henry C. Allen R-NJ
 Moses L. Broocks D-TX
 Mounce Gore Butler D-TN
 William Wildman Campbell R-OH
 Thomas Henry Dale R-PA
 Thomas Beall Davis D-WV
 Frank S. Dickson R-IL
 Frank B. Fulkerson R-MO
 Newton W. Gilbert R-IN
 Rockwood Hoar R-MA
 John L. Kennedy R-NE
 Frank B. Klepper R-MO
 Frank J. LeFevre R-NY
 Mial Eben Lilley R-PA
 Anthony Michalek R-IL
 James M. Richardson D-KY
 Zeno J. Rives R-IL
 Edmund W. Samuel R-PA
 Gustav A. Schneebeli R-PA
 Thomas E. Scroggy R-OH
 Cassius M. Shartel R-MO
 Thomas Alexander Smith D-MD
 William T. Tyndall R-MO
 Marshall Van Winkle R-NJ
 John Welborn R-MO
 Charles S. Wharton R-IL
 Ernest E. Wood D-MO

60th Congress (1907–1909) 
 Joseph Grant Beale R-PA
 John Frank Boyd R-NE
 Joseph Davis Brodhead D-PA
 Henry S. Caulfield R-MO
 George W. Cook R-CO
 Elmer L. Fulton D-OK
 Richard N. Hackett D-NC
 Thomas Hackney D-MO
 Warren A. Haggott R-CO
 Philo Hall R-SD
 J. Eugene Harding R-OH
 Daniel W. Hamilton D-IA
 Addison James R-KY
 William P. Kimball D-KY
 J. Ford Laning R-OH
 Eugene W. Leake D-NJ
 John Thomas Lenahan D-PA
 Samuel McMillan R-NY
 James William Murphy D-WI
 William H. Parker R-SD
 Le Gage Pratt D-NJ
 Peter A. Porter IR-NY
 Madison Roswell Smith D-MO
 Oliver C. Wiley D-AL
 Harry Benjamin Wolf D-MD

61st Congress (1909–1911) 
 William O. Barnard R-IN
 James H. Cassidy R-OH
 Charles H. Cowles R-NC
 Charles E. Creager R-OK
 Charles A. Crow R-MO
 Politte Elvins R-MO
 Hamilton Fish II R-NY
 Eugene Foss D-MA
 Alfred Buckwalter Garner R-PA
 Samuel Louis Gilmore D-LA
 John Gaston Grant R-NC
 Thomas Ray Hamer R-ID
 James Havens D-NY
 William Darius Jamieson D-IA
 Adna R. Johnson R-OH
 James Joyce R-OH
 John Kronmiller R-MD
 Robert M. Lively D-TX
 Frederick Lundin R-IL
 Zachary D. Massey R-TN
 William McCredie R-WA
 Charles S. Millington R-NY
 John Motley Morehead II R-NC
 William Moxley R-IL
 Miles Poindexter R-WA
 Charles Clarence Pratt R-PA
 William Paine Sheffield Jr. R-RI
 John K. Tener R-PA
 Richard Young R-NY

62nd Congress (1911–1913) 
 Theron Akin PR-NY
 Steven Beckwith Ayres ID-NY
 Charles Calvin Bowman R-PA
 Theron Ephron Catlin R-MO
 Richard E. Connell D-NY
 George Curry R-NM
 James Alexander Daugherty D-MO
 Henry S. De Forest R-NY
 Lynden Evans D-IL
 Samuel W. Gould D-ME
 Curtis Hussey Gregg D-PA
 John M. Hamilton D-WV
 Robert O. Harris R-MA
 Jesse Lee Hartman R-PA
 Fred S. Jackson R-KS
 Martin W. Littleton D-NY
 Charles Matthews R-PA
 Alexander C. Mitchell R-KS
 Thomas Parran Sr. R-MD
 William C. Redfield D-NY
 Rollin R. Rees R-KS
 William S. Reyburn R-PA
 Peter Moore Speer R-PA
 Edmund J. Stack D-IL
 Edwin F. Sweet D-MI
 John A. Thayer D-MA
 George Utter R-RI
 Stanton Warburton R-WA
 William Wedemeyer R-MI
 Isaac D. Young R-KS

63rd Congress (1913–1915) 
 Samuel B. Avis R-WV
 J. Thompson Baker D-NJ
 William N. Baltz D-IL
 Silas Reynolds Barton R-NE
 Charles W. Bell R-CA
 Charles M. Borchers D-IL
 Stanley E. Bowdle D-OH
 Robert G. Bremner D-NJ
 Franklin Brockson D-DE
 Lathrop Brown D-NY
 James W. Bryan P-WA
 Jacob A. Cantor D-NY
 Wooda Nicholas Carr D-PA
 John R. Clancy D-NY
 Maurice Connolly D-IA
 Frederick Simpson Deitrick D-MA
 Franklin Lewis Dershem D-PA
 Jeremiah Donovan D-CT
 James Walter Elder D-LA
 Jacob Falconer P-WA
 Louis FitzHenry D-IL
 Michael Joseph Gill D-MO
 Edward Gilmore D-MA
 Robert H. Gittins D-NY
 Forrest Goodwin R-ME
 George E. Gorman D-IL
 Christopher Columbus Harris D-AL
 William H. Hinebaugh P-IL
 Stephen A. Hoxworth D-IL
 Jacob Johnson R-UT
 William Kennedy D-CT
 George John Kindel D-CO
 Sanford Kirkpatrick D-IA
 Claude L'Engle D-FL
 Fred Ewing Lewis R-PA
 Francis O. Lindquist R-MI
 James Washington Logue D-PA
 William Josiah MacDonald P-MI
 Bryan F. Mahan D-CT
 James Manahan R-MN
 Lewis J. Martin D-NJ
 George McClellan D-NY
 Herman A. Metz D-NY
 William Oscar Mulkey D-AL
 James H. O'Brien D-NY
 Frank Trimble O'Hair D-IL
 Denis O'Leary D-NY
 John B. Peterson D-IN
 Eugene Elliott Reed D-NH
 Arthur Ringwalt Rupley R-PA
 Harry H. Seldomridge D-CO
 Frank Owens Smith D-MD
 Raymond Bartlett Stevens D-NH
 Lawrence B. Stringer D-IL
 Benjamin I. Taylor D-NY
 Thomas Chandler Thacher D-MA
 Charles M. Thomson P-IL
 George H. Utter R-RI
 Horace Worth Vaughan D-TX
 Henry Vollmer D-IA
 Samuel Wallin R-NY
 Allan B. Walsh D-NJ
 Stanton Warburton R-WA
 Claude Weaver D-OK

64th Congress (1915–1917) 
 Cyrus William Beales R-PA
 Henry S. Benedict R-CA
 William B. Charles R-NY
 William Henry Coleman R-PA
 James H. Davis D-TX
 Michael F. Farley D-NY
 Peter G. Gerry D-RI
 Robert Freeman Hopwood R-PA
 Michael Liebel Jr. D-PA
 Nelson E. Matthews R-OH
 Paul G. McCorkle D-SC
 Robert M. McCracken R-ID
 Thomas W. Miller R-DE
 William C. Mooney R-OH
 Solomon Taylor North R-PA
 Peter Davis Oakey R-CT
 Tinsley Rucker D-GA
 J. Edward Russell R-OH
 Thomas J. Steele D-IA
 Seward H. Williams R-OH

65th Congress (1917–1919) 
 Mark R. Bacon R-MI
 Earl Hanley Beshlin D-PA
 William F. Birch R-NJ
 Orrin Dubbs Bleakley R-PA
 Henry Alden Clark R-PA
 Daniel Webster Comstock R-IN
 George K. Denton D-IN
 Frederick Essen R-MO
 George B. Francis R-NY
 Victor Heintz R-OH
 Walter Kehoe D-FL
 George R. Lunn D-NY
 Charles Martin D-IL
 Joseph M. McCormick R-IL
 Daniel C. Oliver D-NY
 Albert F. Polk D-DE
 Bruce Foster Sterling D-PA
 Thomas W. Templeton R-PA
 William F. Waldow R-NY
 William B. Walton D-NM
 James Clifton Wilson D-TX

66th Congress (1919–1921) 
 William Noble Andrews R-MD
 John J. Babka D-OH
 Carlos Bee D-TX
 William Thomas Bland D-MO
 Charles R. Evans D-NV
 John W. Harreld R-OK
 Hugh S. Hersman D-CA
 William Henry Hill R-NY
 Clyde R. Hoey D-NC
 John B. Johnston D-NY
 John MacCrate R-NY
 Edward C. Mann D-SC
 Cornelius Augustine McGlennon D-NJ
 Richard F. McKiniry D-NY
 Patrick McLane D-PA
 James G. Monahan R-WI
 Herbert Pell D-NY
 Clifford E. Randall R-WI
 Joseph Rowan D-NY
 Frank L. Smith R-IL
 Charles Swindall R-OK
 King Swope R-KY
 John Haden Wilson D-PA

67th Congress (1921–1923) 
 Martin C. Ansorge R-NY
 T. Frank Appleby R-NJ
 William O. Atkeson R-MO
 Richard Ely Bird R-KS
 Charles G. Bond R-NY
 Vincent M. Brennan R-MI
 Joseph Edgar Brown R-TN
 Wynne F. Clouse R-TN
 George P. Codd R-MI
 Charles Robert Connell R-PA
 Clarence Dennis Coughlin R-PA
 William H. Frankhauser R-MI
 Harry C. Gahn R-OH
 L. M. Gensman R-OK
 Fred Benjamin Gernerd R-PA
 Lewis Henry R-NY
 Manuel Herrick R-OK
 Joseph H. Himes R-OH
 Michael J. Hogan R-NY
 Winnifred Sprague Mason Huck R-IL
 Theodore W. Hukriede R-MO
 Augustin Reed Humphrey R-NE
 William Huntington Kirkpatrick R-PA
 John Kissel R-NY
 Ardolph L. Kline R-NY
 Isaac Clinton Kline R-PA
 Charles Landon Knight R-OH
 Henry F. Lawrence R-MO
 Warren I. Lee R-NY
 Robert S. Maloney R-MA
 Washington J. McCormick R-MT
 Frank C. Millspaugh R-MO
 Néstor Montoya R-NM
 Miner G. Norton R-OH
 Archibald E. Olpp R-NJ
 Roscoe C. Patterson R-MO
 John Paul Jr. R-VA
 Andrew Petersen R-NY
 Joseph C. Pringey R-OK
 Alice Mary Robertson R-OK
 Albert B. Rossdale R-NY
 Thomas Jefferson Ryan R-NY
 Lon A. Scott R-TN
 Guy L. Shaw R-IL
 Samuel A. Shelton R-MO
 Chester W. Taylor D-AR
 Roy H. Thorpe R-NE

68th Congress (1923–1925) 
 Robert E. Lee Allen D-WV
 William H. Boyce D-DE
 Charles Browne D-NJ
 James R. Buckley D-IL
 Samuel E. Cook D-IN
 William Martin Croll D-PA
 Herbert Wesley Cummings D-PA
 Hiram Kinsman Evans R-IA
 Frederick G. Fleetwood R-VT
 Elmer H. Geran D-NJ
 Samuel Feiser Glatfelter D-PA
 William Y. Humphreys D-MS
 Henry L. Jost D-MO
 Robert M. Leach R-MA
 Thomas Jefferson Lilly D-WV
 Frank J. McNulty D-NJ
 Edward E. Miller R-IL
 R. Lee Moore D-GA
 Joseph W. Morris D-KY
 Patrick B. O'Sullivan D-CT
 Charles L. Richards D-NV
 Lewis E. Sawyer D-AR
 William Charles Salmon D-TN
 Frank Crawford Sites D-PA
 Charles I. Stengle D-NY
 Elton Watkins D-OR
 George M. Wertz R-PA
 William E. Wilson D-IN
 J. Scott Wolff D-MO

69th Congress (1925–1927) 
 Stewart H. Appleby R-NJ
 Ralph Emerson Bailey R-MO
 Edmund Nelson Carpenter R-PA
 George B. Churchill R-MA
 Lawrence J. Flaherty R-CA
 Andrew Jackson Kirk R-KY
 Chauncey B. Little D-KS
 Samuel J. Montgomery R-OK
 John B. Sosnowski R-MI
 Joshua William Swartz R-PA
 Harry I. Thayer R-MA
 Harold Tolley R-NY

70th Congress (1927–1929)

71st Congress (1929–1931)

72nd Congress (1931–1933)

73rd Congress (1933–1935)

74th Congress (1935–1937)

75th Congress (1937–1939)

76th Congress (1939–1941)

77th Congress (1941–1943)

78th Congress (1943–1945)

79th Congress (1945–1947)

80th Congress (1947–1949)

81st Congress (1949–1951)

82nd Congress (1951–1953)

83rd Congress (1953–1955)

84th Congress (1955–1957)

85th Congress (1957–1959)

86th Congress (1959–1961)

87th Congress (1961–1963)

88th Congress (1963–1965)

89th Congress (1965–1967)

90th Congress (1967–1969)

91st Congress (1969–1971)

92nd Congress (1971–1973)

93rd Congress (1973–1975)

94th Congress (1975–1977)

95th Congress (1977–1979)

96th Congress (1979–1981)

97th Congress (1981–1983)

98th Congress (1983–1985)

99th Congress (1985–1987)

100th Congress (1987–1989)

101st Congress (1989–1991)

102nd Congress (1991–1993)

103rd Congress (1993–1995)

104th Congress (1995–1997)

105th Congress (1997–1999)

106th Congress (1999–2001)

107th Congress (2001–2003)

108th Congress (2003–2005)

109th Congress (2005–2007)

110th Congress (2007–2009)

111th Congress (2009–2011)

112th Congress (2011–2013)

113th Congress (2013–2015)

114th Congress (2015–2017)

115th Congress (2017–2019)

116th Congress (2019–2021)

117th Congress (2021–2023)

References
Specific

General
The Almanac of American Politics, 1972, 1982, 1986, 1996, 1998, 2000, 2002, 2004, 2006, & 2008
CQ's Politics In America 1992, 1994, & 1996
Congressional Biography Guide website

Single